

135001–135100 

|-bgcolor=#fefefe
| 135001 ||  || — || April 23, 2001 || Socorro || LINEAR || — || align=right | 1.0 km || 
|-id=002 bgcolor=#E9E9E9
| 135002 ||  || — || April 27, 2001 || Socorro || LINEAR || — || align=right | 2.6 km || 
|-id=003 bgcolor=#E9E9E9
| 135003 ||  || — || April 17, 2001 || Anderson Mesa || LONEOS || — || align=right | 7.0 km || 
|-id=004 bgcolor=#E9E9E9
| 135004 ||  || — || April 17, 2001 || Anderson Mesa || LONEOS || RAF || align=right | 2.0 km || 
|-id=005 bgcolor=#fefefe
| 135005 ||  || — || April 24, 2001 || Anderson Mesa || LONEOS || H || align=right | 1.2 km || 
|-id=006 bgcolor=#E9E9E9
| 135006 ||  || — || April 25, 2001 || Anderson Mesa || LONEOS || — || align=right | 3.1 km || 
|-id=007 bgcolor=#E9E9E9
| 135007 ||  || — || April 25, 2001 || Anderson Mesa || LONEOS || EUN || align=right | 2.0 km || 
|-id=008 bgcolor=#E9E9E9
| 135008 || 2001 JB || — || May 2, 2001 || Reedy Creek || J. Broughton || — || align=right | 3.3 km || 
|-id=009 bgcolor=#E9E9E9
| 135009 ||  || — || May 15, 2001 || Kitt Peak || Spacewatch || RAF || align=right | 1.4 km || 
|-id=010 bgcolor=#E9E9E9
| 135010 ||  || — || May 15, 2001 || Palomar || NEAT || — || align=right | 2.7 km || 
|-id=011 bgcolor=#E9E9E9
| 135011 ||  || — || May 18, 2001 || Socorro || LINEAR || — || align=right | 3.9 km || 
|-id=012 bgcolor=#E9E9E9
| 135012 ||  || — || May 18, 2001 || Socorro || LINEAR || PAE || align=right | 4.0 km || 
|-id=013 bgcolor=#E9E9E9
| 135013 ||  || — || May 18, 2001 || Socorro || LINEAR || — || align=right | 3.6 km || 
|-id=014 bgcolor=#fefefe
| 135014 ||  || — || May 17, 2001 || Socorro || LINEAR || MAS || align=right | 1.9 km || 
|-id=015 bgcolor=#fefefe
| 135015 ||  || — || May 21, 2001 || Socorro || LINEAR || NYS || align=right | 2.6 km || 
|-id=016 bgcolor=#E9E9E9
| 135016 ||  || — || May 23, 2001 || Socorro || LINEAR || ADE || align=right | 3.8 km || 
|-id=017 bgcolor=#E9E9E9
| 135017 ||  || — || May 22, 2001 || Socorro || LINEAR || — || align=right | 2.7 km || 
|-id=018 bgcolor=#E9E9E9
| 135018 ||  || — || May 22, 2001 || Socorro || LINEAR || GEF || align=right | 2.6 km || 
|-id=019 bgcolor=#E9E9E9
| 135019 ||  || — || May 22, 2001 || Socorro || LINEAR || — || align=right | 2.0 km || 
|-id=020 bgcolor=#E9E9E9
| 135020 ||  || — || May 24, 2001 || Socorro || LINEAR || — || align=right | 5.2 km || 
|-id=021 bgcolor=#E9E9E9
| 135021 ||  || — || May 26, 2001 || Kitt Peak || Spacewatch || — || align=right | 1.4 km || 
|-id=022 bgcolor=#E9E9E9
| 135022 ||  || — || May 22, 2001 || Anderson Mesa || LONEOS || — || align=right | 4.1 km || 
|-id=023 bgcolor=#E9E9E9
| 135023 ||  || — || May 31, 2001 || Palomar || NEAT || — || align=right | 2.9 km || 
|-id=024 bgcolor=#C2E0FF
| 135024 ||  || — || May 23, 2001 || Cerro Tololo || M. W. Buie || res4:7critical || align=right | 185 km || 
|-id=025 bgcolor=#E9E9E9
| 135025 ||  || — || June 12, 2001 || Kitt Peak || Spacewatch || — || align=right | 1.8 km || 
|-id=026 bgcolor=#E9E9E9
| 135026 ||  || — || June 15, 2001 || Socorro || LINEAR || TIN || align=right | 2.5 km || 
|-id=027 bgcolor=#E9E9E9
| 135027 ||  || — || June 15, 2001 || Socorro || LINEAR || — || align=right | 5.8 km || 
|-id=028 bgcolor=#E9E9E9
| 135028 ||  || — || June 21, 2001 || Socorro || LINEAR || — || align=right | 4.4 km || 
|-id=029 bgcolor=#d6d6d6
| 135029 ||  || — || June 20, 2001 || Haleakala || NEAT || — || align=right | 5.0 km || 
|-id=030 bgcolor=#fefefe
| 135030 ||  || — || June 24, 2001 || Desert Beaver || W. K. Y. Yeung || — || align=right | 1.3 km || 
|-id=031 bgcolor=#E9E9E9
| 135031 ||  || — || June 25, 2001 || Palomar || NEAT || WAT || align=right | 4.8 km || 
|-id=032 bgcolor=#d6d6d6
| 135032 ||  || — || June 20, 2001 || Anderson Mesa || LONEOS || — || align=right | 7.4 km || 
|-id=033 bgcolor=#fefefe
| 135033 ||  || — || June 27, 2001 || Anderson Mesa || LONEOS || NYS || align=right | 1.4 km || 
|-id=034 bgcolor=#d6d6d6
| 135034 ||  || — || June 21, 2001 || Palomar || NEAT || — || align=right | 7.1 km || 
|-id=035 bgcolor=#d6d6d6
| 135035 ||  || — || July 13, 2001 || Palomar || NEAT || — || align=right | 2.5 km || 
|-id=036 bgcolor=#E9E9E9
| 135036 ||  || — || July 14, 2001 || Haleakala || NEAT || HNA || align=right | 3.4 km || 
|-id=037 bgcolor=#E9E9E9
| 135037 ||  || — || July 14, 2001 || Haleakala || NEAT || — || align=right | 4.5 km || 
|-id=038 bgcolor=#d6d6d6
| 135038 ||  || — || July 14, 2001 || Palomar || NEAT || — || align=right | 6.3 km || 
|-id=039 bgcolor=#E9E9E9
| 135039 ||  || — || July 18, 2001 || Palomar || NEAT || — || align=right | 5.8 km || 
|-id=040 bgcolor=#E9E9E9
| 135040 ||  || — || July 19, 2001 || Palomar || NEAT || — || align=right | 4.2 km || 
|-id=041 bgcolor=#fefefe
| 135041 ||  || — || July 21, 2001 || San Marcello || L. Tesi, M. Tombelli || — || align=right | 1.5 km || 
|-id=042 bgcolor=#E9E9E9
| 135042 ||  || — || July 17, 2001 || Haleakala || NEAT || — || align=right | 2.7 km || 
|-id=043 bgcolor=#d6d6d6
| 135043 ||  || — || July 22, 2001 || Palomar || NEAT || — || align=right | 6.6 km || 
|-id=044 bgcolor=#d6d6d6
| 135044 ||  || — || July 19, 2001 || Palomar || NEAT || — || align=right | 5.9 km || 
|-id=045 bgcolor=#E9E9E9
| 135045 ||  || — || July 24, 2001 || Lake Tekapo || I. P. Griffin, N. Brady || — || align=right | 5.6 km || 
|-id=046 bgcolor=#d6d6d6
| 135046 ||  || — || July 22, 2001 || Palomar || NEAT || — || align=right | 6.3 km || 
|-id=047 bgcolor=#d6d6d6
| 135047 ||  || — || July 23, 2001 || Palomar || NEAT || — || align=right | 6.2 km || 
|-id=048 bgcolor=#E9E9E9
| 135048 ||  || — || July 16, 2001 || Anderson Mesa || LONEOS || MRX || align=right | 1.9 km || 
|-id=049 bgcolor=#fefefe
| 135049 ||  || — || July 21, 2001 || Palomar || NEAT || — || align=right | 1.9 km || 
|-id=050 bgcolor=#E9E9E9
| 135050 ||  || — || July 22, 2001 || Palomar || NEAT || GEF || align=right | 2.4 km || 
|-id=051 bgcolor=#d6d6d6
| 135051 ||  || — || July 22, 2001 || Palomar || NEAT || EOS || align=right | 9.5 km || 
|-id=052 bgcolor=#d6d6d6
| 135052 ||  || — || July 23, 2001 || Palomar || NEAT || — || align=right | 5.3 km || 
|-id=053 bgcolor=#E9E9E9
| 135053 ||  || — || July 21, 2001 || Haleakala || NEAT || — || align=right | 5.3 km || 
|-id=054 bgcolor=#E9E9E9
| 135054 ||  || — || July 16, 2001 || Haleakala || NEAT || GEF || align=right | 3.0 km || 
|-id=055 bgcolor=#d6d6d6
| 135055 ||  || — || July 29, 2001 || Palomar || NEAT || BRA || align=right | 3.0 km || 
|-id=056 bgcolor=#d6d6d6
| 135056 ||  || — || July 25, 2001 || Haleakala || NEAT || — || align=right | 5.2 km || 
|-id=057 bgcolor=#fefefe
| 135057 ||  || — || July 26, 2001 || Haleakala || NEAT || — || align=right | 1.9 km || 
|-id=058 bgcolor=#d6d6d6
| 135058 ||  || — || July 30, 2001 || Palomar || NEAT || TIR || align=right | 5.1 km || 
|-id=059 bgcolor=#E9E9E9
| 135059 ||  || — || July 23, 2001 || Haleakala || NEAT || DOR || align=right | 6.4 km || 
|-id=060 bgcolor=#E9E9E9
| 135060 ||  || — || July 28, 2001 || Anderson Mesa || LONEOS || HEN || align=right | 2.1 km || 
|-id=061 bgcolor=#FA8072
| 135061 ||  || — || August 3, 2001 || Haleakala || NEAT || H || align=right data-sort-value="0.89" | 890 m || 
|-id=062 bgcolor=#d6d6d6
| 135062 ||  || — || August 10, 2001 || Palomar || NEAT || — || align=right | 6.2 km || 
|-id=063 bgcolor=#E9E9E9
| 135063 ||  || — || August 10, 2001 || Palomar || NEAT || — || align=right | 3.3 km || 
|-id=064 bgcolor=#d6d6d6
| 135064 ||  || — || August 11, 2001 || Palomar || NEAT || — || align=right | 6.1 km || 
|-id=065 bgcolor=#d6d6d6
| 135065 ||  || — || August 9, 2001 || Palomar || NEAT || — || align=right | 8.0 km || 
|-id=066 bgcolor=#d6d6d6
| 135066 ||  || — || August 11, 2001 || Haleakala || NEAT || — || align=right | 5.6 km || 
|-id=067 bgcolor=#d6d6d6
| 135067 ||  || — || August 11, 2001 || Haleakala || NEAT || — || align=right | 4.0 km || 
|-id=068 bgcolor=#E9E9E9
| 135068 ||  || — || August 11, 2001 || Haleakala || NEAT || — || align=right | 4.7 km || 
|-id=069 bgcolor=#E9E9E9
| 135069 Gagnereau ||  ||  || August 15, 2001 || Pises || Pises Obs. || GEF || align=right | 2.6 km || 
|-id=070 bgcolor=#d6d6d6
| 135070 ||  || — || August 10, 2001 || Palomar || NEAT || EOS || align=right | 4.2 km || 
|-id=071 bgcolor=#d6d6d6
| 135071 ||  || — || August 10, 2001 || Palomar || NEAT || EOS || align=right | 2.9 km || 
|-id=072 bgcolor=#d6d6d6
| 135072 ||  || — || August 10, 2001 || Palomar || NEAT || — || align=right | 5.2 km || 
|-id=073 bgcolor=#d6d6d6
| 135073 ||  || — || August 11, 2001 || Palomar || NEAT || — || align=right | 3.3 km || 
|-id=074 bgcolor=#d6d6d6
| 135074 ||  || — || August 11, 2001 || Palomar || NEAT || — || align=right | 4.7 km || 
|-id=075 bgcolor=#E9E9E9
| 135075 ||  || — || August 12, 2001 || Palomar || NEAT || INO || align=right | 2.9 km || 
|-id=076 bgcolor=#E9E9E9
| 135076 ||  || — || August 14, 2001 || Haleakala || NEAT || HOF || align=right | 4.7 km || 
|-id=077 bgcolor=#d6d6d6
| 135077 ||  || — || August 14, 2001 || Haleakala || NEAT || — || align=right | 4.1 km || 
|-id=078 bgcolor=#d6d6d6
| 135078 ||  || — || August 14, 2001 || Haleakala || NEAT || — || align=right | 7.3 km || 
|-id=079 bgcolor=#d6d6d6
| 135079 ||  || — || August 11, 2001 || Haleakala || NEAT || — || align=right | 4.4 km || 
|-id=080 bgcolor=#d6d6d6
| 135080 ||  || — || August 13, 2001 || Haleakala || NEAT || — || align=right | 6.3 km || 
|-id=081 bgcolor=#d6d6d6
| 135081 ||  || — || August 16, 2001 || Socorro || LINEAR || — || align=right | 4.0 km || 
|-id=082 bgcolor=#E9E9E9
| 135082 ||  || — || August 16, 2001 || Socorro || LINEAR || — || align=right | 5.1 km || 
|-id=083 bgcolor=#d6d6d6
| 135083 ||  || — || August 16, 2001 || Socorro || LINEAR || — || align=right | 5.5 km || 
|-id=084 bgcolor=#E9E9E9
| 135084 ||  || — || August 16, 2001 || Socorro || LINEAR || — || align=right | 1.9 km || 
|-id=085 bgcolor=#E9E9E9
| 135085 ||  || — || August 16, 2001 || Socorro || LINEAR || AGN || align=right | 2.7 km || 
|-id=086 bgcolor=#E9E9E9
| 135086 ||  || — || August 16, 2001 || Socorro || LINEAR || AGN || align=right | 2.3 km || 
|-id=087 bgcolor=#d6d6d6
| 135087 ||  || — || August 16, 2001 || Socorro || LINEAR || — || align=right | 5.4 km || 
|-id=088 bgcolor=#d6d6d6
| 135088 ||  || — || August 16, 2001 || Socorro || LINEAR || EOS || align=right | 3.6 km || 
|-id=089 bgcolor=#d6d6d6
| 135089 ||  || — || August 18, 2001 || Socorro || LINEAR || — || align=right | 5.5 km || 
|-id=090 bgcolor=#d6d6d6
| 135090 ||  || — || August 16, 2001 || Socorro || LINEAR || — || align=right | 7.1 km || 
|-id=091 bgcolor=#d6d6d6
| 135091 ||  || — || August 16, 2001 || Socorro || LINEAR || — || align=right | 4.5 km || 
|-id=092 bgcolor=#d6d6d6
| 135092 ||  || — || August 17, 2001 || Socorro || LINEAR || — || align=right | 5.0 km || 
|-id=093 bgcolor=#d6d6d6
| 135093 ||  || — || August 17, 2001 || Socorro || LINEAR || — || align=right | 7.7 km || 
|-id=094 bgcolor=#d6d6d6
| 135094 ||  || — || August 17, 2001 || Socorro || LINEAR || — || align=right | 5.3 km || 
|-id=095 bgcolor=#E9E9E9
| 135095 ||  || — || August 16, 2001 || Palomar || NEAT || — || align=right | 2.3 km || 
|-id=096 bgcolor=#fefefe
| 135096 ||  || — || August 19, 2001 || Socorro || LINEAR || PHO || align=right | 1.7 km || 
|-id=097 bgcolor=#E9E9E9
| 135097 ||  || — || August 16, 2001 || Socorro || LINEAR || — || align=right | 2.8 km || 
|-id=098 bgcolor=#d6d6d6
| 135098 ||  || — || August 16, 2001 || Socorro || LINEAR || — || align=right | 6.2 km || 
|-id=099 bgcolor=#d6d6d6
| 135099 ||  || — || August 17, 2001 || Socorro || LINEAR || — || align=right | 8.4 km || 
|-id=100 bgcolor=#d6d6d6
| 135100 ||  || — || August 17, 2001 || Socorro || LINEAR || EMA || align=right | 7.5 km || 
|}

135101–135200 

|-bgcolor=#E9E9E9
| 135101 ||  || — || August 17, 2001 || Socorro || LINEAR || GER || align=right | 3.5 km || 
|-id=102 bgcolor=#d6d6d6
| 135102 ||  || — || August 17, 2001 || Socorro || LINEAR || — || align=right | 7.7 km || 
|-id=103 bgcolor=#d6d6d6
| 135103 ||  || — || August 19, 2001 || Socorro || LINEAR || — || align=right | 5.4 km || 
|-id=104 bgcolor=#d6d6d6
| 135104 ||  || — || August 21, 2001 || Haleakala || NEAT || — || align=right | 7.0 km || 
|-id=105 bgcolor=#d6d6d6
| 135105 ||  || — || August 16, 2001 || Socorro || LINEAR || — || align=right | 7.1 km || 
|-id=106 bgcolor=#d6d6d6
| 135106 ||  || — || August 22, 2001 || Haleakala || NEAT || — || align=right | 7.8 km || 
|-id=107 bgcolor=#d6d6d6
| 135107 ||  || — || August 19, 2001 || Haleakala || NEAT || — || align=right | 6.2 km || 
|-id=108 bgcolor=#d6d6d6
| 135108 ||  || — || August 18, 2001 || Socorro || LINEAR || — || align=right | 7.7 km || 
|-id=109 bgcolor=#d6d6d6
| 135109 ||  || — || August 21, 2001 || Socorro || LINEAR || — || align=right | 3.8 km || 
|-id=110 bgcolor=#fefefe
| 135110 ||  || — || August 24, 2001 || Anderson Mesa || LONEOS || — || align=right | 3.2 km || 
|-id=111 bgcolor=#d6d6d6
| 135111 ||  || — || August 25, 2001 || Socorro || LINEAR || — || align=right | 4.5 km || 
|-id=112 bgcolor=#d6d6d6
| 135112 ||  || — || August 25, 2001 || Socorro || LINEAR || — || align=right | 6.8 km || 
|-id=113 bgcolor=#d6d6d6
| 135113 ||  || — || August 25, 2001 || Socorro || LINEAR || — || align=right | 4.7 km || 
|-id=114 bgcolor=#d6d6d6
| 135114 ||  || — || August 25, 2001 || Socorro || LINEAR || EOS || align=right | 6.1 km || 
|-id=115 bgcolor=#d6d6d6
| 135115 ||  || — || August 17, 2001 || Socorro || LINEAR || — || align=right | 5.4 km || 
|-id=116 bgcolor=#d6d6d6
| 135116 ||  || — || August 17, 2001 || Socorro || LINEAR || — || align=right | 5.8 km || 
|-id=117 bgcolor=#fefefe
| 135117 ||  || — || August 17, 2001 || Socorro || LINEAR || — || align=right | 3.2 km || 
|-id=118 bgcolor=#d6d6d6
| 135118 ||  || — || August 17, 2001 || Socorro || LINEAR || TIR || align=right | 5.7 km || 
|-id=119 bgcolor=#d6d6d6
| 135119 ||  || — || August 20, 2001 || Socorro || LINEAR || — || align=right | 5.6 km || 
|-id=120 bgcolor=#d6d6d6
| 135120 ||  || — || August 20, 2001 || Socorro || LINEAR || — || align=right | 6.2 km || 
|-id=121 bgcolor=#d6d6d6
| 135121 ||  || — || August 22, 2001 || Socorro || LINEAR || — || align=right | 6.4 km || 
|-id=122 bgcolor=#d6d6d6
| 135122 ||  || — || August 22, 2001 || Socorro || LINEAR || EOS || align=right | 5.5 km || 
|-id=123 bgcolor=#d6d6d6
| 135123 ||  || — || August 22, 2001 || Socorro || LINEAR || Tj (2.98) || align=right | 6.0 km || 
|-id=124 bgcolor=#d6d6d6
| 135124 ||  || — || August 20, 2001 || Palomar || NEAT || — || align=right | 5.7 km || 
|-id=125 bgcolor=#d6d6d6
| 135125 ||  || — || August 23, 2001 || Anderson Mesa || LONEOS || — || align=right | 8.2 km || 
|-id=126 bgcolor=#d6d6d6
| 135126 ||  || — || August 23, 2001 || Anderson Mesa || LONEOS || KOR || align=right | 3.1 km || 
|-id=127 bgcolor=#d6d6d6
| 135127 ||  || — || August 23, 2001 || Anderson Mesa || LONEOS || — || align=right | 5.9 km || 
|-id=128 bgcolor=#d6d6d6
| 135128 ||  || — || August 23, 2001 || Anderson Mesa || LONEOS || — || align=right | 6.1 km || 
|-id=129 bgcolor=#fefefe
| 135129 ||  || — || August 22, 2001 || Socorro || LINEAR || — || align=right | 1.9 km || 
|-id=130 bgcolor=#d6d6d6
| 135130 ||  || — || August 24, 2001 || Socorro || LINEAR || — || align=right | 6.7 km || 
|-id=131 bgcolor=#d6d6d6
| 135131 ||  || — || August 26, 2001 || Socorro || LINEAR || — || align=right | 4.2 km || 
|-id=132 bgcolor=#d6d6d6
| 135132 ||  || — || August 21, 2001 || Haleakala || NEAT || 615 || align=right | 2.5 km || 
|-id=133 bgcolor=#d6d6d6
| 135133 ||  || — || August 28, 2001 || Palomar || NEAT || — || align=right | 9.2 km || 
|-id=134 bgcolor=#d6d6d6
| 135134 ||  || — || August 28, 2001 || Palomar || NEAT || EOS || align=right | 5.4 km || 
|-id=135 bgcolor=#d6d6d6
| 135135 ||  || — || August 25, 2001 || Palomar || NEAT || — || align=right | 7.2 km || 
|-id=136 bgcolor=#d6d6d6
| 135136 ||  || — || August 17, 2001 || Palomar || NEAT || — || align=right | 5.3 km || 
|-id=137 bgcolor=#d6d6d6
| 135137 ||  || — || August 22, 2001 || Palomar || NEAT || ALA || align=right | 11 km || 
|-id=138 bgcolor=#d6d6d6
| 135138 ||  || — || August 21, 2001 || Haleakala || NEAT || TIR || align=right | 4.0 km || 
|-id=139 bgcolor=#d6d6d6
| 135139 ||  || — || August 22, 2001 || Socorro || LINEAR || — || align=right | 4.5 km || 
|-id=140 bgcolor=#fefefe
| 135140 ||  || — || August 22, 2001 || Palomar || NEAT || H || align=right | 1.2 km || 
|-id=141 bgcolor=#d6d6d6
| 135141 ||  || — || August 22, 2001 || Kitt Peak || Spacewatch || EOS || align=right | 4.7 km || 
|-id=142 bgcolor=#d6d6d6
| 135142 ||  || — || August 22, 2001 || Palomar || NEAT || — || align=right | 6.9 km || 
|-id=143 bgcolor=#d6d6d6
| 135143 ||  || — || August 23, 2001 || Anderson Mesa || LONEOS || — || align=right | 4.5 km || 
|-id=144 bgcolor=#d6d6d6
| 135144 ||  || — || August 23, 2001 || Anderson Mesa || LONEOS || — || align=right | 4.4 km || 
|-id=145 bgcolor=#d6d6d6
| 135145 ||  || — || August 23, 2001 || Anderson Mesa || LONEOS || EOS || align=right | 4.2 km || 
|-id=146 bgcolor=#d6d6d6
| 135146 ||  || — || August 23, 2001 || Anderson Mesa || LONEOS || — || align=right | 4.6 km || 
|-id=147 bgcolor=#E9E9E9
| 135147 ||  || — || August 23, 2001 || Anderson Mesa || LONEOS || — || align=right | 1.9 km || 
|-id=148 bgcolor=#d6d6d6
| 135148 ||  || — || August 23, 2001 || Anderson Mesa || LONEOS || — || align=right | 4.9 km || 
|-id=149 bgcolor=#d6d6d6
| 135149 ||  || — || August 23, 2001 || Anderson Mesa || LONEOS || EOS || align=right | 4.5 km || 
|-id=150 bgcolor=#d6d6d6
| 135150 ||  || — || August 23, 2001 || Anderson Mesa || LONEOS || — || align=right | 5.7 km || 
|-id=151 bgcolor=#d6d6d6
| 135151 ||  || — || August 23, 2001 || Socorro || LINEAR || ALA || align=right | 8.5 km || 
|-id=152 bgcolor=#fefefe
| 135152 ||  || — || August 23, 2001 || Socorro || LINEAR || H || align=right data-sort-value="0.88" | 880 m || 
|-id=153 bgcolor=#d6d6d6
| 135153 ||  || — || August 24, 2001 || Anderson Mesa || LONEOS || EOS || align=right | 3.4 km || 
|-id=154 bgcolor=#E9E9E9
| 135154 ||  || — || August 24, 2001 || Socorro || LINEAR || GEF || align=right | 2.9 km || 
|-id=155 bgcolor=#d6d6d6
| 135155 ||  || — || August 24, 2001 || Anderson Mesa || LONEOS || EOS || align=right | 3.7 km || 
|-id=156 bgcolor=#d6d6d6
| 135156 ||  || — || August 24, 2001 || Anderson Mesa || LONEOS || — || align=right | 4.6 km || 
|-id=157 bgcolor=#E9E9E9
| 135157 ||  || — || August 24, 2001 || Anderson Mesa || LONEOS || RAF || align=right | 1.4 km || 
|-id=158 bgcolor=#d6d6d6
| 135158 ||  || — || August 24, 2001 || Socorro || LINEAR || — || align=right | 4.5 km || 
|-id=159 bgcolor=#fefefe
| 135159 ||  || — || August 24, 2001 || Socorro || LINEAR || — || align=right | 1.8 km || 
|-id=160 bgcolor=#d6d6d6
| 135160 ||  || — || August 24, 2001 || Socorro || LINEAR || — || align=right | 4.7 km || 
|-id=161 bgcolor=#d6d6d6
| 135161 ||  || — || August 24, 2001 || Socorro || LINEAR || EOS || align=right | 5.4 km || 
|-id=162 bgcolor=#d6d6d6
| 135162 ||  || — || August 24, 2001 || Kitt Peak || Spacewatch || — || align=right | 4.9 km || 
|-id=163 bgcolor=#d6d6d6
| 135163 ||  || — || August 24, 2001 || Socorro || LINEAR || — || align=right | 5.4 km || 
|-id=164 bgcolor=#d6d6d6
| 135164 ||  || — || August 24, 2001 || Socorro || LINEAR || — || align=right | 8.5 km || 
|-id=165 bgcolor=#d6d6d6
| 135165 ||  || — || August 24, 2001 || Haleakala || NEAT || EOS || align=right | 3.6 km || 
|-id=166 bgcolor=#E9E9E9
| 135166 ||  || — || August 25, 2001 || Socorro || LINEAR || — || align=right | 6.4 km || 
|-id=167 bgcolor=#d6d6d6
| 135167 ||  || — || August 25, 2001 || Socorro || LINEAR || — || align=right | 6.1 km || 
|-id=168 bgcolor=#d6d6d6
| 135168 ||  || — || August 25, 2001 || Socorro || LINEAR || TEL || align=right | 2.7 km || 
|-id=169 bgcolor=#d6d6d6
| 135169 ||  || — || August 25, 2001 || Socorro || LINEAR || — || align=right | 6.1 km || 
|-id=170 bgcolor=#d6d6d6
| 135170 ||  || — || August 25, 2001 || Socorro || LINEAR || — || align=right | 4.6 km || 
|-id=171 bgcolor=#d6d6d6
| 135171 ||  || — || August 25, 2001 || Kitt Peak || Spacewatch || EOS || align=right | 3.3 km || 
|-id=172 bgcolor=#d6d6d6
| 135172 ||  || — || August 26, 2001 || Anderson Mesa || LONEOS || — || align=right | 5.9 km || 
|-id=173 bgcolor=#FA8072
| 135173 ||  || — || August 20, 2001 || Palomar || NEAT || H || align=right | 1.8 km || 
|-id=174 bgcolor=#fefefe
| 135174 ||  || — || August 19, 2001 || Socorro || LINEAR || — || align=right | 3.4 km || 
|-id=175 bgcolor=#E9E9E9
| 135175 ||  || — || August 19, 2001 || Socorro || LINEAR || PAD || align=right | 3.3 km || 
|-id=176 bgcolor=#d6d6d6
| 135176 ||  || — || August 19, 2001 || Socorro || LINEAR || — || align=right | 4.8 km || 
|-id=177 bgcolor=#d6d6d6
| 135177 ||  || — || August 19, 2001 || Socorro || LINEAR || — || align=right | 5.4 km || 
|-id=178 bgcolor=#d6d6d6
| 135178 ||  || — || August 19, 2001 || Socorro || LINEAR || EUP || align=right | 6.4 km || 
|-id=179 bgcolor=#d6d6d6
| 135179 ||  || — || August 19, 2001 || Haleakala || NEAT || EOS || align=right | 4.4 km || 
|-id=180 bgcolor=#E9E9E9
| 135180 ||  || — || August 16, 2001 || Socorro || LINEAR || — || align=right | 3.4 km || 
|-id=181 bgcolor=#fefefe
| 135181 ||  || — || August 24, 2001 || Socorro || LINEAR || FLO || align=right | 1.6 km || 
|-id=182 bgcolor=#C2E0FF
| 135182 ||  || — || August 21, 2001 || Cerro Tololo || M. W. Buie || other TNOcritical || align=right | 255 km || 
|-id=183 bgcolor=#d6d6d6
| 135183 ||  || — || August 23, 2001 || Anderson Mesa || LONEOS || — || align=right | 5.5 km || 
|-id=184 bgcolor=#d6d6d6
| 135184 ||  || — || August 23, 2001 || Anderson Mesa || LONEOS || — || align=right | 5.9 km || 
|-id=185 bgcolor=#d6d6d6
| 135185 || 2001 RR || — || September 8, 2001 || Socorro || LINEAR || — || align=right | 6.3 km || 
|-id=186 bgcolor=#fefefe
| 135186 ||  || — || September 8, 2001 || Socorro || LINEAR || H || align=right | 1.4 km || 
|-id=187 bgcolor=#d6d6d6
| 135187 ||  || — || September 10, 2001 || Socorro || LINEAR || ALA || align=right | 8.4 km || 
|-id=188 bgcolor=#d6d6d6
| 135188 ||  || — || September 10, 2001 || Socorro || LINEAR || — || align=right | 4.2 km || 
|-id=189 bgcolor=#d6d6d6
| 135189 ||  || — || September 7, 2001 || Socorro || LINEAR || — || align=right | 6.2 km || 
|-id=190 bgcolor=#d6d6d6
| 135190 ||  || — || September 7, 2001 || Socorro || LINEAR || URS || align=right | 9.0 km || 
|-id=191 bgcolor=#d6d6d6
| 135191 ||  || — || September 7, 2001 || Socorro || LINEAR || KOR || align=right | 3.2 km || 
|-id=192 bgcolor=#d6d6d6
| 135192 ||  || — || September 7, 2001 || Socorro || LINEAR || — || align=right | 5.9 km || 
|-id=193 bgcolor=#d6d6d6
| 135193 ||  || — || September 7, 2001 || Socorro || LINEAR || — || align=right | 3.6 km || 
|-id=194 bgcolor=#fefefe
| 135194 ||  || — || September 7, 2001 || Socorro || LINEAR || NYS || align=right | 1.3 km || 
|-id=195 bgcolor=#fefefe
| 135195 ||  || — || September 7, 2001 || Socorro || LINEAR || MAS || align=right | 1.1 km || 
|-id=196 bgcolor=#d6d6d6
| 135196 ||  || — || September 8, 2001 || Socorro || LINEAR || 628 || align=right | 3.4 km || 
|-id=197 bgcolor=#d6d6d6
| 135197 ||  || — || September 11, 2001 || Socorro || LINEAR || — || align=right | 3.4 km || 
|-id=198 bgcolor=#d6d6d6
| 135198 ||  || — || September 6, 2001 || Palomar || NEAT || — || align=right | 5.4 km || 
|-id=199 bgcolor=#d6d6d6
| 135199 ||  || — || September 13, 2001 || Palomar || NEAT || TIR || align=right | 7.4 km || 
|-id=200 bgcolor=#fefefe
| 135200 ||  || — || September 10, 2001 || Socorro || LINEAR || — || align=right | 3.2 km || 
|}

135201–135300 

|-bgcolor=#d6d6d6
| 135201 ||  || — || September 12, 2001 || Socorro || LINEAR || — || align=right | 4.7 km || 
|-id=202 bgcolor=#d6d6d6
| 135202 ||  || — || September 12, 2001 || Socorro || LINEAR || EOS || align=right | 3.4 km || 
|-id=203 bgcolor=#E9E9E9
| 135203 ||  || — || September 12, 2001 || Socorro || LINEAR || — || align=right | 1.8 km || 
|-id=204 bgcolor=#d6d6d6
| 135204 ||  || — || September 12, 2001 || Socorro || LINEAR || — || align=right | 5.5 km || 
|-id=205 bgcolor=#d6d6d6
| 135205 ||  || — || September 12, 2001 || Socorro || LINEAR || EOS || align=right | 4.0 km || 
|-id=206 bgcolor=#d6d6d6
| 135206 ||  || — || September 12, 2001 || Socorro || LINEAR || — || align=right | 5.2 km || 
|-id=207 bgcolor=#d6d6d6
| 135207 ||  || — || September 10, 2001 || Socorro || LINEAR || — || align=right | 4.6 km || 
|-id=208 bgcolor=#d6d6d6
| 135208 ||  || — || September 10, 2001 || Socorro || LINEAR || — || align=right | 9.0 km || 
|-id=209 bgcolor=#fefefe
| 135209 ||  || — || September 10, 2001 || Socorro || LINEAR || FLO || align=right data-sort-value="0.98" | 980 m || 
|-id=210 bgcolor=#d6d6d6
| 135210 ||  || — || September 10, 2001 || Socorro || LINEAR || — || align=right | 6.9 km || 
|-id=211 bgcolor=#d6d6d6
| 135211 ||  || — || September 10, 2001 || Socorro || LINEAR || — || align=right | 4.7 km || 
|-id=212 bgcolor=#d6d6d6
| 135212 ||  || — || September 10, 2001 || Socorro || LINEAR || — || align=right | 4.1 km || 
|-id=213 bgcolor=#d6d6d6
| 135213 ||  || — || September 11, 2001 || Anderson Mesa || LONEOS || EOS || align=right | 6.5 km || 
|-id=214 bgcolor=#d6d6d6
| 135214 ||  || — || September 11, 2001 || Anderson Mesa || LONEOS || — || align=right | 5.5 km || 
|-id=215 bgcolor=#fefefe
| 135215 ||  || — || September 11, 2001 || Anderson Mesa || LONEOS || NYS || align=right | 3.1 km || 
|-id=216 bgcolor=#d6d6d6
| 135216 ||  || — || September 11, 2001 || Anderson Mesa || LONEOS || — || align=right | 4.5 km || 
|-id=217 bgcolor=#d6d6d6
| 135217 ||  || — || September 11, 2001 || Anderson Mesa || LONEOS || EOS || align=right | 4.5 km || 
|-id=218 bgcolor=#d6d6d6
| 135218 ||  || — || September 11, 2001 || Anderson Mesa || LONEOS || — || align=right | 5.4 km || 
|-id=219 bgcolor=#E9E9E9
| 135219 ||  || — || September 11, 2001 || Anderson Mesa || LONEOS || — || align=right | 3.5 km || 
|-id=220 bgcolor=#d6d6d6
| 135220 ||  || — || September 12, 2001 || Socorro || LINEAR || — || align=right | 4.8 km || 
|-id=221 bgcolor=#d6d6d6
| 135221 ||  || — || September 12, 2001 || Socorro || LINEAR || — || align=right | 6.3 km || 
|-id=222 bgcolor=#d6d6d6
| 135222 ||  || — || September 12, 2001 || Socorro || LINEAR || — || align=right | 6.2 km || 
|-id=223 bgcolor=#d6d6d6
| 135223 ||  || — || September 12, 2001 || Socorro || LINEAR || KOR || align=right | 3.5 km || 
|-id=224 bgcolor=#fefefe
| 135224 ||  || — || September 12, 2001 || Socorro || LINEAR || — || align=right | 1.6 km || 
|-id=225 bgcolor=#d6d6d6
| 135225 ||  || — || September 12, 2001 || Socorro || LINEAR || — || align=right | 5.1 km || 
|-id=226 bgcolor=#d6d6d6
| 135226 ||  || — || September 12, 2001 || Socorro || LINEAR || — || align=right | 4.3 km || 
|-id=227 bgcolor=#d6d6d6
| 135227 ||  || — || September 12, 2001 || Socorro || LINEAR || — || align=right | 5.1 km || 
|-id=228 bgcolor=#fefefe
| 135228 ||  || — || September 12, 2001 || Socorro || LINEAR || — || align=right | 1.7 km || 
|-id=229 bgcolor=#d6d6d6
| 135229 ||  || — || September 12, 2001 || Socorro || LINEAR || — || align=right | 3.7 km || 
|-id=230 bgcolor=#d6d6d6
| 135230 ||  || — || September 12, 2001 || Socorro || LINEAR || URS || align=right | 7.0 km || 
|-id=231 bgcolor=#d6d6d6
| 135231 ||  || — || September 12, 2001 || Socorro || LINEAR || EOS || align=right | 4.4 km || 
|-id=232 bgcolor=#fefefe
| 135232 ||  || — || September 12, 2001 || Socorro || LINEAR || NYS || align=right | 1.4 km || 
|-id=233 bgcolor=#fefefe
| 135233 ||  || — || September 8, 2001 || Socorro || LINEAR || H || align=right data-sort-value="0.98" | 980 m || 
|-id=234 bgcolor=#d6d6d6
| 135234 ||  || — || September 11, 2001 || Palomar || NEAT || MEL || align=right | 5.8 km || 
|-id=235 bgcolor=#d6d6d6
| 135235 ||  || — || September 11, 2001 || Anderson Mesa || LONEOS || HYG || align=right | 5.3 km || 
|-id=236 bgcolor=#d6d6d6
| 135236 ||  || — || September 11, 2001 || Anderson Mesa || LONEOS || — || align=right | 6.0 km || 
|-id=237 bgcolor=#d6d6d6
| 135237 ||  || — || September 18, 2001 || Goodricke-Pigott || R. A. Tucker || CRO || align=right | 6.6 km || 
|-id=238 bgcolor=#fefefe
| 135238 ||  || — || September 16, 2001 || Socorro || LINEAR || H || align=right | 1.1 km || 
|-id=239 bgcolor=#d6d6d6
| 135239 ||  || — || September 19, 2001 || Fountain Hills || C. W. Juels, P. R. Holvorcem || — || align=right | 9.1 km || 
|-id=240 bgcolor=#d6d6d6
| 135240 ||  || — || September 19, 2001 || Prescott || P. G. Comba || THM || align=right | 4.1 km || 
|-id=241 bgcolor=#d6d6d6
| 135241 ||  || — || September 16, 2001 || Socorro || LINEAR || — || align=right | 5.8 km || 
|-id=242 bgcolor=#d6d6d6
| 135242 ||  || — || September 16, 2001 || Socorro || LINEAR || EOS || align=right | 4.3 km || 
|-id=243 bgcolor=#d6d6d6
| 135243 ||  || — || September 16, 2001 || Socorro || LINEAR || THM || align=right | 4.3 km || 
|-id=244 bgcolor=#d6d6d6
| 135244 ||  || — || September 16, 2001 || Socorro || LINEAR || — || align=right | 5.8 km || 
|-id=245 bgcolor=#d6d6d6
| 135245 ||  || — || September 16, 2001 || Socorro || LINEAR || — || align=right | 3.7 km || 
|-id=246 bgcolor=#d6d6d6
| 135246 ||  || — || September 16, 2001 || Socorro || LINEAR || — || align=right | 5.6 km || 
|-id=247 bgcolor=#fefefe
| 135247 ||  || — || September 16, 2001 || Socorro || LINEAR || — || align=right | 1.8 km || 
|-id=248 bgcolor=#d6d6d6
| 135248 ||  || — || September 16, 2001 || Socorro || LINEAR || — || align=right | 5.8 km || 
|-id=249 bgcolor=#d6d6d6
| 135249 ||  || — || September 16, 2001 || Socorro || LINEAR || — || align=right | 5.9 km || 
|-id=250 bgcolor=#d6d6d6
| 135250 ||  || — || September 16, 2001 || Socorro || LINEAR || THM || align=right | 5.6 km || 
|-id=251 bgcolor=#d6d6d6
| 135251 ||  || — || September 16, 2001 || Socorro || LINEAR || — || align=right | 6.7 km || 
|-id=252 bgcolor=#d6d6d6
| 135252 ||  || — || September 16, 2001 || Socorro || LINEAR || EUP || align=right | 4.6 km || 
|-id=253 bgcolor=#d6d6d6
| 135253 ||  || — || September 16, 2001 || Socorro || LINEAR || HYG || align=right | 6.9 km || 
|-id=254 bgcolor=#fefefe
| 135254 ||  || — || September 16, 2001 || Socorro || LINEAR || — || align=right | 1.6 km || 
|-id=255 bgcolor=#d6d6d6
| 135255 ||  || — || September 16, 2001 || Socorro || LINEAR || EOS || align=right | 4.5 km || 
|-id=256 bgcolor=#d6d6d6
| 135256 ||  || — || September 16, 2001 || Socorro || LINEAR || — || align=right | 5.8 km || 
|-id=257 bgcolor=#d6d6d6
| 135257 ||  || — || September 16, 2001 || Socorro || LINEAR || — || align=right | 4.8 km || 
|-id=258 bgcolor=#d6d6d6
| 135258 ||  || — || September 16, 2001 || Socorro || LINEAR || — || align=right | 5.1 km || 
|-id=259 bgcolor=#d6d6d6
| 135259 ||  || — || September 16, 2001 || Socorro || LINEAR || URS || align=right | 6.2 km || 
|-id=260 bgcolor=#d6d6d6
| 135260 ||  || — || September 17, 2001 || Socorro || LINEAR || — || align=right | 5.6 km || 
|-id=261 bgcolor=#d6d6d6
| 135261 ||  || — || September 17, 2001 || Socorro || LINEAR || EOS || align=right | 6.4 km || 
|-id=262 bgcolor=#d6d6d6
| 135262 ||  || — || September 17, 2001 || Socorro || LINEAR || EOS || align=right | 4.0 km || 
|-id=263 bgcolor=#d6d6d6
| 135263 ||  || — || September 18, 2001 || Jonathan B. Postel || V. Pozzoli || EOS || align=right | 3.8 km || 
|-id=264 bgcolor=#d6d6d6
| 135264 ||  || — || September 21, 2001 || Palomar || NEAT || — || align=right | 5.3 km || 
|-id=265 bgcolor=#d6d6d6
| 135265 ||  || — || September 19, 2001 || Anderson Mesa || LONEOS || EOS || align=right | 4.0 km || 
|-id=266 bgcolor=#d6d6d6
| 135266 ||  || — || September 17, 2001 || Socorro || LINEAR || HYG || align=right | 7.6 km || 
|-id=267 bgcolor=#d6d6d6
| 135267 ||  || — || September 20, 2001 || Socorro || LINEAR || — || align=right | 4.8 km || 
|-id=268 bgcolor=#d6d6d6
| 135268 Haigneré ||  ||  || September 20, 2001 || Le Creusot || J.-C. Merlin || — || align=right | 6.2 km || 
|-id=269 bgcolor=#d6d6d6
| 135269 ||  || — || September 16, 2001 || Socorro || LINEAR || — || align=right | 5.7 km || 
|-id=270 bgcolor=#d6d6d6
| 135270 ||  || — || September 16, 2001 || Socorro || LINEAR || — || align=right | 4.7 km || 
|-id=271 bgcolor=#fefefe
| 135271 ||  || — || September 16, 2001 || Socorro || LINEAR || FLO || align=right | 1.1 km || 
|-id=272 bgcolor=#d6d6d6
| 135272 ||  || — || September 16, 2001 || Socorro || LINEAR || — || align=right | 6.2 km || 
|-id=273 bgcolor=#d6d6d6
| 135273 ||  || — || September 16, 2001 || Socorro || LINEAR || EOS || align=right | 4.5 km || 
|-id=274 bgcolor=#d6d6d6
| 135274 ||  || — || September 16, 2001 || Socorro || LINEAR || — || align=right | 5.6 km || 
|-id=275 bgcolor=#d6d6d6
| 135275 ||  || — || September 16, 2001 || Socorro || LINEAR || — || align=right | 4.3 km || 
|-id=276 bgcolor=#fefefe
| 135276 ||  || — || September 16, 2001 || Socorro || LINEAR || — || align=right | 1.4 km || 
|-id=277 bgcolor=#d6d6d6
| 135277 ||  || — || September 16, 2001 || Socorro || LINEAR || — || align=right | 4.7 km || 
|-id=278 bgcolor=#fefefe
| 135278 ||  || — || September 16, 2001 || Socorro || LINEAR || NYS || align=right | 3.0 km || 
|-id=279 bgcolor=#d6d6d6
| 135279 ||  || — || September 16, 2001 || Socorro || LINEAR || — || align=right | 5.9 km || 
|-id=280 bgcolor=#d6d6d6
| 135280 ||  || — || September 16, 2001 || Socorro || LINEAR || — || align=right | 6.2 km || 
|-id=281 bgcolor=#d6d6d6
| 135281 ||  || — || September 16, 2001 || Socorro || LINEAR || — || align=right | 3.7 km || 
|-id=282 bgcolor=#d6d6d6
| 135282 ||  || — || September 16, 2001 || Socorro || LINEAR || — || align=right | 4.9 km || 
|-id=283 bgcolor=#d6d6d6
| 135283 ||  || — || September 16, 2001 || Socorro || LINEAR || — || align=right | 5.5 km || 
|-id=284 bgcolor=#d6d6d6
| 135284 ||  || — || September 16, 2001 || Socorro || LINEAR || — || align=right | 4.7 km || 
|-id=285 bgcolor=#fefefe
| 135285 ||  || — || September 17, 2001 || Socorro || LINEAR || — || align=right | 1.6 km || 
|-id=286 bgcolor=#d6d6d6
| 135286 ||  || — || September 17, 2001 || Socorro || LINEAR || — || align=right | 5.4 km || 
|-id=287 bgcolor=#fefefe
| 135287 ||  || — || September 17, 2001 || Socorro || LINEAR || NYS || align=right | 2.2 km || 
|-id=288 bgcolor=#d6d6d6
| 135288 ||  || — || September 17, 2001 || Socorro || LINEAR || THM || align=right | 3.5 km || 
|-id=289 bgcolor=#d6d6d6
| 135289 ||  || — || September 17, 2001 || Socorro || LINEAR || — || align=right | 4.6 km || 
|-id=290 bgcolor=#d6d6d6
| 135290 ||  || — || September 17, 2001 || Socorro || LINEAR || — || align=right | 5.1 km || 
|-id=291 bgcolor=#d6d6d6
| 135291 ||  || — || September 17, 2001 || Socorro || LINEAR || — || align=right | 5.6 km || 
|-id=292 bgcolor=#E9E9E9
| 135292 ||  || — || September 17, 2001 || Socorro || LINEAR || — || align=right | 3.8 km || 
|-id=293 bgcolor=#d6d6d6
| 135293 ||  || — || September 17, 2001 || Socorro || LINEAR || — || align=right | 5.8 km || 
|-id=294 bgcolor=#d6d6d6
| 135294 ||  || — || September 19, 2001 || Socorro || LINEAR || — || align=right | 4.3 km || 
|-id=295 bgcolor=#d6d6d6
| 135295 ||  || — || September 19, 2001 || Socorro || LINEAR || — || align=right | 4.3 km || 
|-id=296 bgcolor=#d6d6d6
| 135296 ||  || — || September 19, 2001 || Socorro || LINEAR || — || align=right | 5.1 km || 
|-id=297 bgcolor=#d6d6d6
| 135297 ||  || — || September 19, 2001 || Socorro || LINEAR || HYG || align=right | 4.2 km || 
|-id=298 bgcolor=#fefefe
| 135298 ||  || — || September 19, 2001 || Socorro || LINEAR || — || align=right | 1.8 km || 
|-id=299 bgcolor=#d6d6d6
| 135299 ||  || — || September 19, 2001 || Socorro || LINEAR || EOS || align=right | 3.4 km || 
|-id=300 bgcolor=#d6d6d6
| 135300 ||  || — || September 19, 2001 || Socorro || LINEAR || EOS || align=right | 3.0 km || 
|}

135301–135400 

|-bgcolor=#d6d6d6
| 135301 ||  || — || September 19, 2001 || Socorro || LINEAR || THM || align=right | 4.8 km || 
|-id=302 bgcolor=#d6d6d6
| 135302 ||  || — || September 19, 2001 || Socorro || LINEAR || THM || align=right | 4.3 km || 
|-id=303 bgcolor=#fefefe
| 135303 ||  || — || September 19, 2001 || Socorro || LINEAR || V || align=right | 1.3 km || 
|-id=304 bgcolor=#fefefe
| 135304 ||  || — || September 19, 2001 || Socorro || LINEAR || NYS || align=right | 1.3 km || 
|-id=305 bgcolor=#d6d6d6
| 135305 ||  || — || September 19, 2001 || Socorro || LINEAR || THM || align=right | 4.6 km || 
|-id=306 bgcolor=#d6d6d6
| 135306 ||  || — || September 19, 2001 || Socorro || LINEAR || — || align=right | 4.9 km || 
|-id=307 bgcolor=#d6d6d6
| 135307 ||  || — || September 19, 2001 || Socorro || LINEAR || — || align=right | 4.2 km || 
|-id=308 bgcolor=#E9E9E9
| 135308 ||  || — || September 19, 2001 || Socorro || LINEAR || — || align=right | 2.5 km || 
|-id=309 bgcolor=#d6d6d6
| 135309 ||  || — || September 21, 2001 || Socorro || LINEAR || — || align=right | 7.1 km || 
|-id=310 bgcolor=#d6d6d6
| 135310 ||  || — || September 17, 2001 || Desert Eagle || W. K. Y. Yeung || — || align=right | 5.1 km || 
|-id=311 bgcolor=#d6d6d6
| 135311 ||  || — || September 25, 2001 || Desert Eagle || W. K. Y. Yeung || — || align=right | 6.1 km || 
|-id=312 bgcolor=#d6d6d6
| 135312 ||  || — || September 25, 2001 || Desert Eagle || W. K. Y. Yeung || — || align=right | 5.3 km || 
|-id=313 bgcolor=#d6d6d6
| 135313 ||  || — || September 19, 2001 || Kitt Peak || Spacewatch || KOR || align=right | 2.5 km || 
|-id=314 bgcolor=#d6d6d6
| 135314 ||  || — || September 20, 2001 || Socorro || LINEAR || EOS || align=right | 3.6 km || 
|-id=315 bgcolor=#d6d6d6
| 135315 ||  || — || September 21, 2001 || Anderson Mesa || LONEOS || 7:4 || align=right | 7.2 km || 
|-id=316 bgcolor=#d6d6d6
| 135316 ||  || — || September 21, 2001 || Anderson Mesa || LONEOS || — || align=right | 6.8 km || 
|-id=317 bgcolor=#d6d6d6
| 135317 ||  || — || September 21, 2001 || Anderson Mesa || LONEOS || THM || align=right | 6.1 km || 
|-id=318 bgcolor=#d6d6d6
| 135318 ||  || — || September 22, 2001 || Palomar || NEAT || — || align=right | 4.5 km || 
|-id=319 bgcolor=#E9E9E9
| 135319 ||  || — || September 29, 2001 || Palomar || NEAT || RAF || align=right | 2.0 km || 
|-id=320 bgcolor=#d6d6d6
| 135320 ||  || — || September 20, 2001 || Socorro || LINEAR || — || align=right | 4.1 km || 
|-id=321 bgcolor=#d6d6d6
| 135321 ||  || — || September 20, 2001 || Socorro || LINEAR || — || align=right | 3.8 km || 
|-id=322 bgcolor=#fefefe
| 135322 ||  || — || September 20, 2001 || Socorro || LINEAR || — || align=right | 1.6 km || 
|-id=323 bgcolor=#d6d6d6
| 135323 ||  || — || September 22, 2001 || Socorro || LINEAR || — || align=right | 7.0 km || 
|-id=324 bgcolor=#d6d6d6
| 135324 ||  || — || September 21, 2001 || Socorro || LINEAR || — || align=right | 5.2 km || 
|-id=325 bgcolor=#d6d6d6
| 135325 ||  || — || September 23, 2001 || Socorro || LINEAR || — || align=right | 4.4 km || 
|-id=326 bgcolor=#d6d6d6
| 135326 ||  || — || September 21, 2001 || Socorro || LINEAR || — || align=right | 2.8 km || 
|-id=327 bgcolor=#d6d6d6
| 135327 ||  || — || September 25, 2001 || Socorro || LINEAR || — || align=right | 5.6 km || 
|-id=328 bgcolor=#fefefe
| 135328 ||  || — || September 25, 2001 || Socorro || LINEAR || — || align=right | 1.6 km || 
|-id=329 bgcolor=#fefefe
| 135329 ||  || — || September 18, 2001 || Anderson Mesa || LONEOS || NYS || align=right | 2.9 km || 
|-id=330 bgcolor=#d6d6d6
| 135330 ||  || — || September 22, 2001 || Anderson Mesa || LONEOS || — || align=right | 9.0 km || 
|-id=331 bgcolor=#d6d6d6
| 135331 ||  || — || September 25, 2001 || Socorro || LINEAR || — || align=right | 5.6 km || 
|-id=332 bgcolor=#d6d6d6
| 135332 ||  || — || September 25, 2001 || Socorro || LINEAR || — || align=right | 5.7 km || 
|-id=333 bgcolor=#fefefe
| 135333 ||  || — || October 8, 2001 || Palomar || NEAT || — || align=right | 2.7 km || 
|-id=334 bgcolor=#d6d6d6
| 135334 ||  || — || October 15, 2001 || Socorro || LINEAR || — || align=right | 5.2 km || 
|-id=335 bgcolor=#d6d6d6
| 135335 ||  || — || October 7, 2001 || Palomar || NEAT || — || align=right | 3.9 km || 
|-id=336 bgcolor=#d6d6d6
| 135336 ||  || — || October 11, 2001 || Socorro || LINEAR || EUP || align=right | 8.6 km || 
|-id=337 bgcolor=#E9E9E9
| 135337 ||  || — || October 13, 2001 || Ondřejov || P. Pravec, P. Kušnirák || HEN || align=right | 2.1 km || 
|-id=338 bgcolor=#d6d6d6
| 135338 ||  || — || October 9, 2001 || Socorro || LINEAR || — || align=right | 3.8 km || 
|-id=339 bgcolor=#d6d6d6
| 135339 ||  || — || October 11, 2001 || Socorro || LINEAR || URS || align=right | 3.8 km || 
|-id=340 bgcolor=#d6d6d6
| 135340 ||  || — || October 13, 2001 || Socorro || LINEAR || AEG || align=right | 6.5 km || 
|-id=341 bgcolor=#E9E9E9
| 135341 ||  || — || October 13, 2001 || Socorro || LINEAR || — || align=right | 3.8 km || 
|-id=342 bgcolor=#E9E9E9
| 135342 ||  || — || October 14, 2001 || Socorro || LINEAR || — || align=right | 2.7 km || 
|-id=343 bgcolor=#d6d6d6
| 135343 ||  || — || October 14, 2001 || Socorro || LINEAR || — || align=right | 4.8 km || 
|-id=344 bgcolor=#E9E9E9
| 135344 ||  || — || October 14, 2001 || Socorro || LINEAR || — || align=right | 4.1 km || 
|-id=345 bgcolor=#d6d6d6
| 135345 ||  || — || October 14, 2001 || Socorro || LINEAR || — || align=right | 8.4 km || 
|-id=346 bgcolor=#d6d6d6
| 135346 ||  || — || October 15, 2001 || Socorro || LINEAR || EUP || align=right | 7.6 km || 
|-id=347 bgcolor=#E9E9E9
| 135347 ||  || — || October 9, 2001 || Kitt Peak || Spacewatch || — || align=right | 2.1 km || 
|-id=348 bgcolor=#d6d6d6
| 135348 ||  || — || October 14, 2001 || Socorro || LINEAR || EOS || align=right | 4.3 km || 
|-id=349 bgcolor=#d6d6d6
| 135349 ||  || — || October 13, 2001 || Socorro || LINEAR || HYG || align=right | 5.2 km || 
|-id=350 bgcolor=#E9E9E9
| 135350 ||  || — || October 13, 2001 || Socorro || LINEAR || PAD || align=right | 3.2 km || 
|-id=351 bgcolor=#d6d6d6
| 135351 ||  || — || October 13, 2001 || Socorro || LINEAR || — || align=right | 3.2 km || 
|-id=352 bgcolor=#d6d6d6
| 135352 ||  || — || October 13, 2001 || Socorro || LINEAR || — || align=right | 4.6 km || 
|-id=353 bgcolor=#d6d6d6
| 135353 ||  || — || October 13, 2001 || Socorro || LINEAR || THM || align=right | 4.0 km || 
|-id=354 bgcolor=#d6d6d6
| 135354 ||  || — || October 13, 2001 || Socorro || LINEAR || THM || align=right | 5.8 km || 
|-id=355 bgcolor=#d6d6d6
| 135355 ||  || — || October 13, 2001 || Socorro || LINEAR || — || align=right | 6.4 km || 
|-id=356 bgcolor=#d6d6d6
| 135356 ||  || — || October 14, 2001 || Socorro || LINEAR || EOS || align=right | 3.8 km || 
|-id=357 bgcolor=#d6d6d6
| 135357 ||  || — || October 14, 2001 || Socorro || LINEAR || THM || align=right | 5.5 km || 
|-id=358 bgcolor=#d6d6d6
| 135358 ||  || — || October 13, 2001 || Socorro || LINEAR || — || align=right | 4.7 km || 
|-id=359 bgcolor=#d6d6d6
| 135359 ||  || — || October 14, 2001 || Socorro || LINEAR || HYG || align=right | 5.0 km || 
|-id=360 bgcolor=#d6d6d6
| 135360 ||  || — || October 14, 2001 || Socorro || LINEAR || — || align=right | 5.3 km || 
|-id=361 bgcolor=#d6d6d6
| 135361 ||  || — || October 15, 2001 || Socorro || LINEAR || — || align=right | 9.8 km || 
|-id=362 bgcolor=#d6d6d6
| 135362 ||  || — || October 15, 2001 || Socorro || LINEAR || — || align=right | 4.9 km || 
|-id=363 bgcolor=#d6d6d6
| 135363 ||  || — || October 6, 2001 || Palomar || NEAT || — || align=right | 6.4 km || 
|-id=364 bgcolor=#d6d6d6
| 135364 ||  || — || October 12, 2001 || Haleakala || NEAT || EOS || align=right | 4.2 km || 
|-id=365 bgcolor=#d6d6d6
| 135365 ||  || — || October 12, 2001 || Haleakala || NEAT || EOS || align=right | 4.2 km || 
|-id=366 bgcolor=#d6d6d6
| 135366 ||  || — || October 12, 2001 || Haleakala || NEAT || — || align=right | 6.4 km || 
|-id=367 bgcolor=#d6d6d6
| 135367 ||  || — || October 10, 2001 || Kitt Peak || Spacewatch || — || align=right | 4.9 km || 
|-id=368 bgcolor=#fefefe
| 135368 ||  || — || October 13, 2001 || Kitt Peak || Spacewatch || NYS || align=right | 1.4 km || 
|-id=369 bgcolor=#E9E9E9
| 135369 ||  || — || October 10, 2001 || Palomar || NEAT || WIT || align=right | 2.1 km || 
|-id=370 bgcolor=#d6d6d6
| 135370 ||  || — || October 12, 2001 || Haleakala || NEAT || LUT || align=right | 8.6 km || 
|-id=371 bgcolor=#E9E9E9
| 135371 ||  || — || October 13, 2001 || Palomar || NEAT || INO || align=right | 2.6 km || 
|-id=372 bgcolor=#d6d6d6
| 135372 ||  || — || October 14, 2001 || Palomar || NEAT || — || align=right | 6.1 km || 
|-id=373 bgcolor=#d6d6d6
| 135373 ||  || — || October 14, 2001 || Palomar || NEAT || LIX || align=right | 6.8 km || 
|-id=374 bgcolor=#E9E9E9
| 135374 ||  || — || October 10, 2001 || Palomar || NEAT || POS || align=right | 7.0 km || 
|-id=375 bgcolor=#d6d6d6
| 135375 ||  || — || October 10, 2001 || Palomar || NEAT || — || align=right | 8.0 km || 
|-id=376 bgcolor=#d6d6d6
| 135376 ||  || — || October 10, 2001 || Palomar || NEAT || TIR || align=right | 4.4 km || 
|-id=377 bgcolor=#d6d6d6
| 135377 ||  || — || October 10, 2001 || Palomar || NEAT || HYG || align=right | 6.8 km || 
|-id=378 bgcolor=#fefefe
| 135378 ||  || — || October 10, 2001 || Palomar || NEAT || V || align=right | 1.3 km || 
|-id=379 bgcolor=#d6d6d6
| 135379 ||  || — || October 15, 2001 || Palomar || NEAT || — || align=right | 6.2 km || 
|-id=380 bgcolor=#d6d6d6
| 135380 ||  || — || October 11, 2001 || Palomar || NEAT || — || align=right | 5.8 km || 
|-id=381 bgcolor=#d6d6d6
| 135381 ||  || — || October 11, 2001 || Palomar || NEAT || — || align=right | 5.3 km || 
|-id=382 bgcolor=#fefefe
| 135382 ||  || — || October 11, 2001 || Palomar || NEAT || — || align=right | 1.4 km || 
|-id=383 bgcolor=#d6d6d6
| 135383 ||  || — || October 14, 2001 || Socorro || LINEAR || — || align=right | 5.5 km || 
|-id=384 bgcolor=#d6d6d6
| 135384 ||  || — || October 15, 2001 || Socorro || LINEAR || LIX || align=right | 7.4 km || 
|-id=385 bgcolor=#d6d6d6
| 135385 ||  || — || October 14, 2001 || Socorro || LINEAR || FIR || align=right | 5.1 km || 
|-id=386 bgcolor=#d6d6d6
| 135386 ||  || — || October 14, 2001 || Socorro || LINEAR || HYG || align=right | 4.1 km || 
|-id=387 bgcolor=#fefefe
| 135387 ||  || — || October 14, 2001 || Socorro || LINEAR || — || align=right | 1.2 km || 
|-id=388 bgcolor=#E9E9E9
| 135388 ||  || — || October 14, 2001 || Socorro || LINEAR || — || align=right | 2.7 km || 
|-id=389 bgcolor=#d6d6d6
| 135389 ||  || — || October 14, 2001 || Socorro || LINEAR || — || align=right | 6.2 km || 
|-id=390 bgcolor=#d6d6d6
| 135390 ||  || — || October 12, 2001 || Haleakala || NEAT || ALA || align=right | 5.0 km || 
|-id=391 bgcolor=#d6d6d6
| 135391 ||  || — || October 14, 2001 || Palomar || NEAT || — || align=right | 7.4 km || 
|-id=392 bgcolor=#d6d6d6
| 135392 ||  || — || October 11, 2001 || Socorro || LINEAR || — || align=right | 5.2 km || 
|-id=393 bgcolor=#d6d6d6
| 135393 ||  || — || October 11, 2001 || Socorro || LINEAR || — || align=right | 4.1 km || 
|-id=394 bgcolor=#d6d6d6
| 135394 ||  || — || October 11, 2001 || Socorro || LINEAR || — || align=right | 3.7 km || 
|-id=395 bgcolor=#d6d6d6
| 135395 ||  || — || October 11, 2001 || Socorro || LINEAR || — || align=right | 5.6 km || 
|-id=396 bgcolor=#d6d6d6
| 135396 ||  || — || October 11, 2001 || Socorro || LINEAR || — || align=right | 5.4 km || 
|-id=397 bgcolor=#d6d6d6
| 135397 ||  || — || October 12, 2001 || Kitt Peak || Spacewatch || — || align=right | 4.0 km || 
|-id=398 bgcolor=#d6d6d6
| 135398 ||  || — || October 13, 2001 || Anderson Mesa || LONEOS || — || align=right | 7.3 km || 
|-id=399 bgcolor=#d6d6d6
| 135399 ||  || — || October 13, 2001 || Palomar || NEAT || — || align=right | 4.5 km || 
|-id=400 bgcolor=#d6d6d6
| 135400 ||  || — || October 13, 2001 || Palomar || NEAT || — || align=right | 5.4 km || 
|}

135401–135500 

|-bgcolor=#d6d6d6
| 135401 ||  || — || October 13, 2001 || Palomar || NEAT || ELF || align=right | 6.3 km || 
|-id=402 bgcolor=#d6d6d6
| 135402 ||  || — || October 13, 2001 || Palomar || NEAT || ALA || align=right | 8.5 km || 
|-id=403 bgcolor=#d6d6d6
| 135403 ||  || — || October 13, 2001 || Palomar || NEAT || — || align=right | 7.2 km || 
|-id=404 bgcolor=#d6d6d6
| 135404 ||  || — || October 14, 2001 || Anderson Mesa || LONEOS || VER || align=right | 7.2 km || 
|-id=405 bgcolor=#d6d6d6
| 135405 ||  || — || October 14, 2001 || Palomar || NEAT || TIR || align=right | 6.5 km || 
|-id=406 bgcolor=#d6d6d6
| 135406 ||  || — || October 15, 2001 || Socorro || LINEAR || 637 || align=right | 5.2 km || 
|-id=407 bgcolor=#d6d6d6
| 135407 ||  || — || October 15, 2001 || Socorro || LINEAR || — || align=right | 5.7 km || 
|-id=408 bgcolor=#d6d6d6
| 135408 ||  || — || October 15, 2001 || Kitt Peak || Spacewatch || — || align=right | 6.1 km || 
|-id=409 bgcolor=#d6d6d6
| 135409 ||  || — || October 15, 2001 || Palomar || NEAT || EOS || align=right | 3.2 km || 
|-id=410 bgcolor=#d6d6d6
| 135410 ||  || — || October 21, 2001 || Desert Eagle || W. K. Y. Yeung || HYG || align=right | 6.1 km || 
|-id=411 bgcolor=#d6d6d6
| 135411 ||  || — || October 25, 2001 || Desert Eagle || W. K. Y. Yeung || HYG || align=right | 6.5 km || 
|-id=412 bgcolor=#d6d6d6
| 135412 ||  || — || October 17, 2001 || Socorro || LINEAR || — || align=right | 4.9 km || 
|-id=413 bgcolor=#E9E9E9
| 135413 ||  || — || October 17, 2001 || Socorro || LINEAR || — || align=right | 3.3 km || 
|-id=414 bgcolor=#d6d6d6
| 135414 ||  || — || October 18, 2001 || Socorro || LINEAR || ALA || align=right | 9.9 km || 
|-id=415 bgcolor=#d6d6d6
| 135415 ||  || — || October 18, 2001 || Socorro || LINEAR || — || align=right | 6.9 km || 
|-id=416 bgcolor=#d6d6d6
| 135416 ||  || — || October 18, 2001 || Socorro || LINEAR || VER || align=right | 6.8 km || 
|-id=417 bgcolor=#d6d6d6
| 135417 ||  || — || October 16, 2001 || Socorro || LINEAR || ALA || align=right | 5.8 km || 
|-id=418 bgcolor=#d6d6d6
| 135418 ||  || — || October 16, 2001 || Socorro || LINEAR || — || align=right | 8.1 km || 
|-id=419 bgcolor=#d6d6d6
| 135419 ||  || — || October 16, 2001 || Socorro || LINEAR || — || align=right | 4.7 km || 
|-id=420 bgcolor=#d6d6d6
| 135420 ||  || — || October 17, 2001 || Socorro || LINEAR || THM || align=right | 4.3 km || 
|-id=421 bgcolor=#d6d6d6
| 135421 ||  || — || October 17, 2001 || Socorro || LINEAR || slow || align=right | 6.1 km || 
|-id=422 bgcolor=#d6d6d6
| 135422 ||  || — || October 20, 2001 || Socorro || LINEAR || — || align=right | 4.1 km || 
|-id=423 bgcolor=#d6d6d6
| 135423 ||  || — || October 20, 2001 || Socorro || LINEAR || — || align=right | 6.1 km || 
|-id=424 bgcolor=#d6d6d6
| 135424 ||  || — || October 21, 2001 || Socorro || LINEAR || — || align=right | 5.0 km || 
|-id=425 bgcolor=#E9E9E9
| 135425 ||  || — || October 17, 2001 || Socorro || LINEAR || MRX || align=right | 1.9 km || 
|-id=426 bgcolor=#E9E9E9
| 135426 ||  || — || October 20, 2001 || Socorro || LINEAR || HOF || align=right | 4.1 km || 
|-id=427 bgcolor=#E9E9E9
| 135427 ||  || — || October 21, 2001 || Socorro || LINEAR || — || align=right | 2.7 km || 
|-id=428 bgcolor=#d6d6d6
| 135428 ||  || — || October 22, 2001 || Socorro || LINEAR || — || align=right | 6.5 km || 
|-id=429 bgcolor=#d6d6d6
| 135429 ||  || — || October 22, 2001 || Socorro || LINEAR || TIR || align=right | 5.2 km || 
|-id=430 bgcolor=#d6d6d6
| 135430 ||  || — || October 22, 2001 || Socorro || LINEAR || HYG || align=right | 6.5 km || 
|-id=431 bgcolor=#d6d6d6
| 135431 ||  || — || October 20, 2001 || Socorro || LINEAR || — || align=right | 4.6 km || 
|-id=432 bgcolor=#d6d6d6
| 135432 ||  || — || October 23, 2001 || Socorro || LINEAR || — || align=right | 5.2 km || 
|-id=433 bgcolor=#E9E9E9
| 135433 ||  || — || October 23, 2001 || Socorro || LINEAR || — || align=right | 2.5 km || 
|-id=434 bgcolor=#fefefe
| 135434 ||  || — || October 23, 2001 || Socorro || LINEAR || — || align=right | 1.3 km || 
|-id=435 bgcolor=#E9E9E9
| 135435 ||  || — || October 23, 2001 || Socorro || LINEAR || — || align=right | 3.4 km || 
|-id=436 bgcolor=#d6d6d6
| 135436 ||  || — || October 23, 2001 || Socorro || LINEAR || THM || align=right | 5.7 km || 
|-id=437 bgcolor=#E9E9E9
| 135437 ||  || — || October 23, 2001 || Socorro || LINEAR || HEN || align=right | 1.9 km || 
|-id=438 bgcolor=#fefefe
| 135438 ||  || — || October 23, 2001 || Socorro || LINEAR || — || align=right | 1.8 km || 
|-id=439 bgcolor=#d6d6d6
| 135439 ||  || — || October 26, 2001 || Palomar || NEAT || — || align=right | 8.0 km || 
|-id=440 bgcolor=#d6d6d6
| 135440 ||  || — || October 26, 2001 || Haleakala || NEAT || — || align=right | 6.7 km || 
|-id=441 bgcolor=#fefefe
| 135441 ||  || — || October 19, 2001 || Palomar || NEAT || FLO || align=right data-sort-value="0.96" | 960 m || 
|-id=442 bgcolor=#d6d6d6
| 135442 ||  || — || October 20, 2001 || Socorro || LINEAR || — || align=right | 4.7 km || 
|-id=443 bgcolor=#fefefe
| 135443 ||  || — || October 20, 2001 || Kitt Peak || Spacewatch || FLO || align=right data-sort-value="0.97" | 970 m || 
|-id=444 bgcolor=#d6d6d6
| 135444 ||  || — || November 9, 2001 || Socorro || LINEAR || THM || align=right | 4.0 km || 
|-id=445 bgcolor=#E9E9E9
| 135445 ||  || — || November 10, 2001 || Socorro || LINEAR || — || align=right | 4.8 km || 
|-id=446 bgcolor=#d6d6d6
| 135446 ||  || — || November 10, 2001 || Socorro || LINEAR || — || align=right | 7.9 km || 
|-id=447 bgcolor=#d6d6d6
| 135447 ||  || — || November 6, 2001 || Palomar || NEAT || — || align=right | 7.0 km || 
|-id=448 bgcolor=#d6d6d6
| 135448 ||  || — || November 10, 2001 || Palomar || NEAT || — || align=right | 8.6 km || 
|-id=449 bgcolor=#d6d6d6
| 135449 ||  || — || November 10, 2001 || Socorro || LINEAR || — || align=right | 7.1 km || 
|-id=450 bgcolor=#d6d6d6
| 135450 ||  || — || November 9, 2001 || Socorro || LINEAR || — || align=right | 6.5 km || 
|-id=451 bgcolor=#E9E9E9
| 135451 ||  || — || November 9, 2001 || Socorro || LINEAR || AGN || align=right | 1.9 km || 
|-id=452 bgcolor=#d6d6d6
| 135452 ||  || — || November 9, 2001 || Socorro || LINEAR || THM || align=right | 7.0 km || 
|-id=453 bgcolor=#d6d6d6
| 135453 ||  || — || November 9, 2001 || Socorro || LINEAR || — || align=right | 6.6 km || 
|-id=454 bgcolor=#d6d6d6
| 135454 ||  || — || November 9, 2001 || Socorro || LINEAR || — || align=right | 5.6 km || 
|-id=455 bgcolor=#d6d6d6
| 135455 ||  || — || November 10, 2001 || Socorro || LINEAR || — || align=right | 6.5 km || 
|-id=456 bgcolor=#d6d6d6
| 135456 ||  || — || November 10, 2001 || Socorro || LINEAR || EOS || align=right | 5.3 km || 
|-id=457 bgcolor=#d6d6d6
| 135457 ||  || — || November 10, 2001 || Socorro || LINEAR || — || align=right | 6.7 km || 
|-id=458 bgcolor=#d6d6d6
| 135458 ||  || — || November 10, 2001 || Socorro || LINEAR || — || align=right | 8.1 km || 
|-id=459 bgcolor=#E9E9E9
| 135459 ||  || — || November 10, 2001 || Socorro || LINEAR || — || align=right | 3.2 km || 
|-id=460 bgcolor=#d6d6d6
| 135460 ||  || — || November 10, 2001 || Socorro || LINEAR || — || align=right | 5.8 km || 
|-id=461 bgcolor=#E9E9E9
| 135461 ||  || — || November 12, 2001 || Socorro || LINEAR || — || align=right | 2.5 km || 
|-id=462 bgcolor=#fefefe
| 135462 ||  || — || November 15, 2001 || Palomar || NEAT || H || align=right data-sort-value="0.92" | 920 m || 
|-id=463 bgcolor=#E9E9E9
| 135463 ||  || — || November 10, 2001 || Socorro || LINEAR || — || align=right | 2.3 km || 
|-id=464 bgcolor=#d6d6d6
| 135464 ||  || — || November 12, 2001 || Socorro || LINEAR || — || align=right | 4.2 km || 
|-id=465 bgcolor=#d6d6d6
| 135465 ||  || — || November 15, 2001 || Socorro || LINEAR || — || align=right | 4.5 km || 
|-id=466 bgcolor=#d6d6d6
| 135466 ||  || — || November 15, 2001 || Socorro || LINEAR || — || align=right | 5.6 km || 
|-id=467 bgcolor=#d6d6d6
| 135467 ||  || — || November 15, 2001 || Socorro || LINEAR || — || align=right | 7.0 km || 
|-id=468 bgcolor=#d6d6d6
| 135468 ||  || — || November 15, 2001 || Socorro || LINEAR || — || align=right | 6.1 km || 
|-id=469 bgcolor=#E9E9E9
| 135469 ||  || — || November 12, 2001 || Socorro || LINEAR || — || align=right | 2.4 km || 
|-id=470 bgcolor=#d6d6d6
| 135470 ||  || — || November 17, 2001 || Socorro || LINEAR || — || align=right | 7.7 km || 
|-id=471 bgcolor=#E9E9E9
| 135471 ||  || — || November 17, 2001 || Socorro || LINEAR || — || align=right | 2.9 km || 
|-id=472 bgcolor=#E9E9E9
| 135472 ||  || — || November 17, 2001 || Socorro || LINEAR || — || align=right | 3.0 km || 
|-id=473 bgcolor=#E9E9E9
| 135473 ||  || — || November 18, 2001 || Socorro || LINEAR || — || align=right | 2.8 km || 
|-id=474 bgcolor=#d6d6d6
| 135474 ||  || — || November 17, 2001 || Socorro || LINEAR || THM || align=right | 3.8 km || 
|-id=475 bgcolor=#E9E9E9
| 135475 ||  || — || November 17, 2001 || Socorro || LINEAR || — || align=right | 2.7 km || 
|-id=476 bgcolor=#E9E9E9
| 135476 ||  || — || November 17, 2001 || Socorro || LINEAR || — || align=right | 2.5 km || 
|-id=477 bgcolor=#fefefe
| 135477 ||  || — || November 17, 2001 || Socorro || LINEAR || H || align=right | 1.2 km || 
|-id=478 bgcolor=#d6d6d6
| 135478 ||  || — || November 19, 2001 || Anderson Mesa || LONEOS || — || align=right | 5.8 km || 
|-id=479 bgcolor=#d6d6d6
| 135479 ||  || — || November 19, 2001 || Anderson Mesa || LONEOS || — || align=right | 7.8 km || 
|-id=480 bgcolor=#d6d6d6
| 135480 ||  || — || November 19, 2001 || Anderson Mesa || LONEOS || ALA || align=right | 6.4 km || 
|-id=481 bgcolor=#d6d6d6
| 135481 ||  || — || November 19, 2001 || Anderson Mesa || LONEOS || — || align=right | 6.1 km || 
|-id=482 bgcolor=#E9E9E9
| 135482 ||  || — || November 20, 2001 || Socorro || LINEAR || — || align=right | 3.6 km || 
|-id=483 bgcolor=#d6d6d6
| 135483 ||  || — || November 17, 2001 || Haleakala || NEAT || SYL7:4 || align=right | 7.0 km || 
|-id=484 bgcolor=#fefefe
| 135484 ||  || — || November 16, 2001 || Kitt Peak || Spacewatch || FLO || align=right | 1.3 km || 
|-id=485 bgcolor=#fefefe
| 135485 ||  || — || December 8, 2001 || Oizumi || T. Kobayashi || FLO || align=right | 1.3 km || 
|-id=486 bgcolor=#fefefe
| 135486 ||  || — || December 8, 2001 || Socorro || LINEAR || H || align=right | 1.1 km || 
|-id=487 bgcolor=#fefefe
| 135487 ||  || — || December 8, 2001 || Socorro || LINEAR || H || align=right | 1.8 km || 
|-id=488 bgcolor=#d6d6d6
| 135488 ||  || — || December 7, 2001 || Socorro || LINEAR || — || align=right | 7.0 km || 
|-id=489 bgcolor=#d6d6d6
| 135489 ||  || — || December 8, 2001 || Socorro || LINEAR || TIR || align=right | 7.3 km || 
|-id=490 bgcolor=#d6d6d6
| 135490 ||  || — || December 9, 2001 || Socorro || LINEAR || TRP || align=right | 6.6 km || 
|-id=491 bgcolor=#E9E9E9
| 135491 ||  || — || December 9, 2001 || Socorro || LINEAR || MRX || align=right | 2.3 km || 
|-id=492 bgcolor=#d6d6d6
| 135492 ||  || — || December 9, 2001 || Socorro || LINEAR || EOS || align=right | 4.0 km || 
|-id=493 bgcolor=#d6d6d6
| 135493 ||  || — || December 10, 2001 || Socorro || LINEAR || — || align=right | 10 km || 
|-id=494 bgcolor=#E9E9E9
| 135494 ||  || — || December 10, 2001 || Socorro || LINEAR || — || align=right | 2.7 km || 
|-id=495 bgcolor=#d6d6d6
| 135495 ||  || — || December 10, 2001 || Socorro || LINEAR || THM || align=right | 4.9 km || 
|-id=496 bgcolor=#d6d6d6
| 135496 ||  || — || December 10, 2001 || Socorro || LINEAR || — || align=right | 6.4 km || 
|-id=497 bgcolor=#d6d6d6
| 135497 ||  || — || December 11, 2001 || Socorro || LINEAR || HYG || align=right | 5.9 km || 
|-id=498 bgcolor=#d6d6d6
| 135498 ||  || — || December 11, 2001 || Socorro || LINEAR || EUP || align=right | 8.1 km || 
|-id=499 bgcolor=#E9E9E9
| 135499 ||  || — || December 11, 2001 || Socorro || LINEAR || AGN || align=right | 2.4 km || 
|-id=500 bgcolor=#E9E9E9
| 135500 ||  || — || December 10, 2001 || Socorro || LINEAR || — || align=right | 2.9 km || 
|}

135501–135600 

|-bgcolor=#fefefe
| 135501 ||  || — || December 10, 2001 || Socorro || LINEAR || — || align=right | 1.3 km || 
|-id=502 bgcolor=#d6d6d6
| 135502 ||  || — || December 10, 2001 || Socorro || LINEAR || — || align=right | 7.7 km || 
|-id=503 bgcolor=#E9E9E9
| 135503 ||  || — || December 10, 2001 || Socorro || LINEAR || — || align=right | 1.8 km || 
|-id=504 bgcolor=#d6d6d6
| 135504 ||  || — || December 11, 2001 || Socorro || LINEAR || URS || align=right | 6.4 km || 
|-id=505 bgcolor=#E9E9E9
| 135505 ||  || — || December 14, 2001 || Socorro || LINEAR || — || align=right | 2.5 km || 
|-id=506 bgcolor=#d6d6d6
| 135506 ||  || — || December 14, 2001 || Socorro || LINEAR || THM || align=right | 4.2 km || 
|-id=507 bgcolor=#d6d6d6
| 135507 ||  || — || December 14, 2001 || Socorro || LINEAR || HYG || align=right | 5.6 km || 
|-id=508 bgcolor=#E9E9E9
| 135508 ||  || — || December 15, 2001 || Socorro || LINEAR || AGN || align=right | 2.2 km || 
|-id=509 bgcolor=#d6d6d6
| 135509 ||  || — || December 15, 2001 || Socorro || LINEAR || — || align=right | 5.1 km || 
|-id=510 bgcolor=#fefefe
| 135510 ||  || — || December 15, 2001 || Socorro || LINEAR || — || align=right | 1.5 km || 
|-id=511 bgcolor=#fefefe
| 135511 ||  || — || December 15, 2001 || Socorro || LINEAR || — || align=right | 1.9 km || 
|-id=512 bgcolor=#d6d6d6
| 135512 ||  || — || December 7, 2001 || Palomar || NEAT || — || align=right | 8.4 km || 
|-id=513 bgcolor=#E9E9E9
| 135513 ||  || — || December 11, 2001 || Socorro || LINEAR || — || align=right | 4.5 km || 
|-id=514 bgcolor=#d6d6d6
| 135514 ||  || — || December 14, 2001 || Anderson Mesa || LONEOS || — || align=right | 7.1 km || 
|-id=515 bgcolor=#d6d6d6
| 135515 || 2001 YT || — || December 18, 2001 || Kingsnake || J. V. McClusky || EUP || align=right | 6.5 km || 
|-id=516 bgcolor=#fefefe
| 135516 ||  || — || December 17, 2001 || Socorro || LINEAR || — || align=right | 1.4 km || 
|-id=517 bgcolor=#E9E9E9
| 135517 ||  || — || December 18, 2001 || Socorro || LINEAR || — || align=right | 2.1 km || 
|-id=518 bgcolor=#fefefe
| 135518 ||  || — || December 18, 2001 || Socorro || LINEAR || — || align=right data-sort-value="0.98" | 980 m || 
|-id=519 bgcolor=#d6d6d6
| 135519 ||  || — || December 18, 2001 || Socorro || LINEAR || — || align=right | 5.1 km || 
|-id=520 bgcolor=#fefefe
| 135520 ||  || — || December 18, 2001 || Socorro || LINEAR || NYS || align=right | 2.9 km || 
|-id=521 bgcolor=#fefefe
| 135521 ||  || — || December 18, 2001 || Socorro || LINEAR || — || align=right | 1.3 km || 
|-id=522 bgcolor=#d6d6d6
| 135522 ||  || — || December 17, 2001 || Socorro || LINEAR || — || align=right | 4.3 km || 
|-id=523 bgcolor=#d6d6d6
| 135523 ||  || — || December 18, 2001 || Socorro || LINEAR || HYG || align=right | 5.4 km || 
|-id=524 bgcolor=#fefefe
| 135524 ||  || — || December 19, 2001 || Palomar || NEAT || — || align=right | 1.3 km || 
|-id=525 bgcolor=#E9E9E9
| 135525 ||  || — || January 11, 2002 || Desert Eagle || W. K. Y. Yeung || — || align=right | 3.8 km || 
|-id=526 bgcolor=#E9E9E9
| 135526 ||  || — || January 13, 2002 || Socorro || LINEAR || AGN || align=right | 1.9 km || 
|-id=527 bgcolor=#fefefe
| 135527 ||  || — || January 13, 2002 || Socorro || LINEAR || — || align=right | 1.3 km || 
|-id=528 bgcolor=#fefefe
| 135528 ||  || — || January 5, 2002 || Palomar || NEAT || H || align=right data-sort-value="0.99" | 990 m || 
|-id=529 bgcolor=#d6d6d6
| 135529 ||  || — || January 13, 2002 || Socorro || LINEAR || — || align=right | 4.7 km || 
|-id=530 bgcolor=#fefefe
| 135530 ||  || — || January 13, 2002 || Socorro || LINEAR || FLO || align=right | 1.1 km || 
|-id=531 bgcolor=#fefefe
| 135531 ||  || — || January 19, 2002 || Socorro || LINEAR || — || align=right | 2.3 km || 
|-id=532 bgcolor=#d6d6d6
| 135532 ||  || — || February 7, 2002 || Fountain Hills || C. W. Juels, P. R. Holvorcem || — || align=right | 6.7 km || 
|-id=533 bgcolor=#fefefe
| 135533 ||  || — || February 12, 2002 || Desert Eagle || W. K. Y. Yeung || — || align=right | 1.5 km || 
|-id=534 bgcolor=#fefefe
| 135534 ||  || — || February 7, 2002 || Socorro || LINEAR || — || align=right | 1.2 km || 
|-id=535 bgcolor=#fefefe
| 135535 ||  || — || February 7, 2002 || Socorro || LINEAR || — || align=right | 1.2 km || 
|-id=536 bgcolor=#fefefe
| 135536 ||  || — || February 7, 2002 || Socorro || LINEAR || — || align=right data-sort-value="0.88" | 880 m || 
|-id=537 bgcolor=#fefefe
| 135537 ||  || — || February 8, 2002 || Socorro || LINEAR || — || align=right | 2.9 km || 
|-id=538 bgcolor=#fefefe
| 135538 ||  || — || February 10, 2002 || Socorro || LINEAR || — || align=right | 1.1 km || 
|-id=539 bgcolor=#fefefe
| 135539 ||  || — || February 11, 2002 || Socorro || LINEAR || V || align=right data-sort-value="0.96" | 960 m || 
|-id=540 bgcolor=#C2FFFF
| 135540 ||  || — || February 13, 2002 || Socorro || LINEAR || L4 || align=right | 12 km || 
|-id=541 bgcolor=#fefefe
| 135541 ||  || — || February 3, 2002 || Palomar || NEAT || FLO || align=right data-sort-value="0.97" | 970 m || 
|-id=542 bgcolor=#E9E9E9
| 135542 ||  || — || February 10, 2002 || Kitt Peak || Spacewatch || — || align=right | 1.2 km || 
|-id=543 bgcolor=#d6d6d6
| 135543 ||  || — || February 10, 2002 || Socorro || LINEAR || EOS || align=right | 3.6 km || 
|-id=544 bgcolor=#E9E9E9
| 135544 ||  || — || February 10, 2002 || Socorro || LINEAR || — || align=right | 2.4 km || 
|-id=545 bgcolor=#fefefe
| 135545 ||  || — || February 11, 2002 || Socorro || LINEAR || — || align=right | 1.3 km || 
|-id=546 bgcolor=#fefefe
| 135546 ||  || — || March 13, 2002 || Socorro || LINEAR || FLO || align=right | 1.1 km || 
|-id=547 bgcolor=#C2FFFF
| 135547 ||  || — || March 6, 2002 || Palomar || NEAT || L4 || align=right | 18 km || 
|-id=548 bgcolor=#fefefe
| 135548 ||  || — || March 9, 2002 || Socorro || LINEAR || — || align=right | 1.2 km || 
|-id=549 bgcolor=#fefefe
| 135549 ||  || — || March 9, 2002 || Socorro || LINEAR || — || align=right data-sort-value="0.99" | 990 m || 
|-id=550 bgcolor=#fefefe
| 135550 ||  || — || March 9, 2002 || Kitt Peak || Spacewatch || — || align=right data-sort-value="0.99" | 990 m || 
|-id=551 bgcolor=#fefefe
| 135551 ||  || — || March 12, 2002 || Socorro || LINEAR || — || align=right | 1.4 km || 
|-id=552 bgcolor=#fefefe
| 135552 ||  || — || March 12, 2002 || Palomar || NEAT || — || align=right | 1.3 km || 
|-id=553 bgcolor=#fefefe
| 135553 ||  || — || March 13, 2002 || Socorro || LINEAR || — || align=right | 1.4 km || 
|-id=554 bgcolor=#fefefe
| 135554 ||  || — || March 13, 2002 || Socorro || LINEAR || FLO || align=right | 1.4 km || 
|-id=555 bgcolor=#fefefe
| 135555 ||  || — || March 13, 2002 || Socorro || LINEAR || V || align=right | 1.3 km || 
|-id=556 bgcolor=#fefefe
| 135556 ||  || — || March 13, 2002 || Socorro || LINEAR || KLI || align=right | 2.7 km || 
|-id=557 bgcolor=#fefefe
| 135557 ||  || — || March 13, 2002 || Socorro || LINEAR || — || align=right | 1.6 km || 
|-id=558 bgcolor=#fefefe
| 135558 ||  || — || March 13, 2002 || Socorro || LINEAR || NYS || align=right data-sort-value="0.94" | 940 m || 
|-id=559 bgcolor=#fefefe
| 135559 ||  || — || March 16, 2002 || Socorro || LINEAR || — || align=right | 1.1 km || 
|-id=560 bgcolor=#fefefe
| 135560 ||  || — || March 20, 2002 || Socorro || LINEAR || PHO || align=right | 1.8 km || 
|-id=561 bgcolor=#fefefe
| 135561 Tautvaisiene ||  ||  || March 16, 2002 || Moletai || K. Černis, J. Zdanavičius || FLO || align=right | 1.00 km || 
|-id=562 bgcolor=#fefefe
| 135562 ||  || — || March 16, 2002 || Socorro || LINEAR || — || align=right | 1.3 km || 
|-id=563 bgcolor=#fefefe
| 135563 ||  || — || March 16, 2002 || Socorro || LINEAR || FLO || align=right | 1.1 km || 
|-id=564 bgcolor=#fefefe
| 135564 ||  || — || April 14, 2002 || Socorro || LINEAR || FLO || align=right | 1.2 km || 
|-id=565 bgcolor=#fefefe
| 135565 ||  || — || April 10, 2002 || Socorro || LINEAR || — || align=right | 1.5 km || 
|-id=566 bgcolor=#fefefe
| 135566 ||  || — || April 14, 2002 || Socorro || LINEAR || V || align=right data-sort-value="0.95" | 950 m || 
|-id=567 bgcolor=#fefefe
| 135567 ||  || — || April 15, 2002 || Socorro || LINEAR || FLO || align=right | 1.2 km || 
|-id=568 bgcolor=#fefefe
| 135568 ||  || — || April 15, 2002 || Socorro || LINEAR || NYS || align=right | 1.3 km || 
|-id=569 bgcolor=#fefefe
| 135569 ||  || — || April 15, 2002 || Palomar || NEAT || NYS || align=right | 1.4 km || 
|-id=570 bgcolor=#fefefe
| 135570 ||  || — || April 14, 2002 || Socorro || LINEAR || V || align=right | 1.4 km || 
|-id=571 bgcolor=#C2E0FF
| 135571 ||  || — || April 8, 2002 || Cerro Tololo || M. W. Buie || res2:5critical || align=right | 161 km || 
|-id=572 bgcolor=#fefefe
| 135572 ||  || — || April 1, 2002 || Palomar || NEAT || FLO || align=right | 1.2 km || 
|-id=573 bgcolor=#fefefe
| 135573 ||  || — || April 4, 2002 || Palomar || NEAT || — || align=right | 1.3 km || 
|-id=574 bgcolor=#fefefe
| 135574 ||  || — || April 5, 2002 || Palomar || NEAT || — || align=right | 1.5 km || 
|-id=575 bgcolor=#fefefe
| 135575 ||  || — || April 5, 2002 || Palomar || NEAT || — || align=right | 1.6 km || 
|-id=576 bgcolor=#fefefe
| 135576 ||  || — || April 5, 2002 || Palomar || NEAT || — || align=right | 1.5 km || 
|-id=577 bgcolor=#fefefe
| 135577 ||  || — || April 8, 2002 || Kitt Peak || Spacewatch || FLO || align=right | 1.1 km || 
|-id=578 bgcolor=#fefefe
| 135578 ||  || — || April 9, 2002 || Anderson Mesa || LONEOS || — || align=right | 1.3 km || 
|-id=579 bgcolor=#fefefe
| 135579 ||  || — || April 9, 2002 || Anderson Mesa || LONEOS || — || align=right | 1.8 km || 
|-id=580 bgcolor=#fefefe
| 135580 ||  || — || April 9, 2002 || Kitt Peak || Spacewatch || — || align=right | 1.2 km || 
|-id=581 bgcolor=#fefefe
| 135581 ||  || — || April 10, 2002 || Socorro || LINEAR || — || align=right | 2.1 km || 
|-id=582 bgcolor=#fefefe
| 135582 ||  || — || April 10, 2002 || Socorro || LINEAR || ERI || align=right | 2.6 km || 
|-id=583 bgcolor=#fefefe
| 135583 ||  || — || April 9, 2002 || Socorro || LINEAR || FLO || align=right | 1.2 km || 
|-id=584 bgcolor=#fefefe
| 135584 ||  || — || April 10, 2002 || Socorro || LINEAR || FLO || align=right | 1.2 km || 
|-id=585 bgcolor=#E9E9E9
| 135585 ||  || — || April 10, 2002 || Socorro || LINEAR || GEF || align=right | 2.7 km || 
|-id=586 bgcolor=#fefefe
| 135586 ||  || — || April 10, 2002 || Socorro || LINEAR || V || align=right | 1.0 km || 
|-id=587 bgcolor=#E9E9E9
| 135587 ||  || — || April 11, 2002 || Anderson Mesa || LONEOS || GEF || align=right | 2.6 km || 
|-id=588 bgcolor=#fefefe
| 135588 ||  || — || April 10, 2002 || Socorro || LINEAR || — || align=right | 1.3 km || 
|-id=589 bgcolor=#fefefe
| 135589 ||  || — || April 10, 2002 || Socorro || LINEAR || FLO || align=right | 1.4 km || 
|-id=590 bgcolor=#fefefe
| 135590 ||  || — || April 11, 2002 || Socorro || LINEAR || — || align=right | 1.2 km || 
|-id=591 bgcolor=#fefefe
| 135591 ||  || — || April 11, 2002 || Socorro || LINEAR || V || align=right | 1.1 km || 
|-id=592 bgcolor=#fefefe
| 135592 ||  || — || April 12, 2002 || Socorro || LINEAR || — || align=right | 1.2 km || 
|-id=593 bgcolor=#C2FFFF
| 135593 ||  || — || April 12, 2002 || Socorro || LINEAR || L4 || align=right | 12 km || 
|-id=594 bgcolor=#C2FFFF
| 135594 ||  || — || April 13, 2002 || Palomar || NEAT || L4 || align=right | 17 km || 
|-id=595 bgcolor=#fefefe
| 135595 ||  || — || April 14, 2002 || Socorro || LINEAR || — || align=right | 1.2 km || 
|-id=596 bgcolor=#E9E9E9
| 135596 ||  || — || April 9, 2002 || Socorro || LINEAR || — || align=right | 2.6 km || 
|-id=597 bgcolor=#fefefe
| 135597 ||  || — || April 9, 2002 || Socorro || LINEAR || — || align=right | 1.0 km || 
|-id=598 bgcolor=#fefefe
| 135598 ||  || — || April 10, 2002 || Socorro || LINEAR || NYS || align=right | 1.2 km || 
|-id=599 bgcolor=#fefefe
| 135599 || 2002 HU || — || April 16, 2002 || Desert Eagle || W. K. Y. Yeung || — || align=right | 1.7 km || 
|-id=600 bgcolor=#fefefe
| 135600 ||  || — || April 16, 2002 || Socorro || LINEAR || — || align=right | 1.6 km || 
|}

135601–135700 

|-bgcolor=#fefefe
| 135601 ||  || — || April 16, 2002 || Socorro || LINEAR || — || align=right | 1.4 km || 
|-id=602 bgcolor=#fefefe
| 135602 ||  || — || April 17, 2002 || Socorro || LINEAR || V || align=right | 1.2 km || 
|-id=603 bgcolor=#fefefe
| 135603 ||  || — || April 29, 2002 || Palomar || NEAT || — || align=right | 1.2 km || 
|-id=604 bgcolor=#fefefe
| 135604 ||  || — || May 8, 2002 || Socorro || LINEAR || FLO || align=right | 1.3 km || 
|-id=605 bgcolor=#E9E9E9
| 135605 ||  || — || May 7, 2002 || Palomar || NEAT || — || align=right | 3.6 km || 
|-id=606 bgcolor=#fefefe
| 135606 ||  || — || May 7, 2002 || Palomar || NEAT || — || align=right | 1.2 km || 
|-id=607 bgcolor=#fefefe
| 135607 ||  || — || May 9, 2002 || Desert Eagle || W. K. Y. Yeung || V || align=right | 1.2 km || 
|-id=608 bgcolor=#fefefe
| 135608 ||  || — || May 8, 2002 || Socorro || LINEAR || FLO || align=right | 1.7 km || 
|-id=609 bgcolor=#fefefe
| 135609 ||  || — || May 8, 2002 || Socorro || LINEAR || — || align=right | 1.2 km || 
|-id=610 bgcolor=#fefefe
| 135610 ||  || — || May 8, 2002 || Socorro || LINEAR || — || align=right | 1.8 km || 
|-id=611 bgcolor=#fefefe
| 135611 ||  || — || May 8, 2002 || Socorro || LINEAR || FLO || align=right | 1.3 km || 
|-id=612 bgcolor=#fefefe
| 135612 ||  || — || May 8, 2002 || Socorro || LINEAR || NYS || align=right | 1.2 km || 
|-id=613 bgcolor=#fefefe
| 135613 ||  || — || May 9, 2002 || Socorro || LINEAR || FLO || align=right | 1.2 km || 
|-id=614 bgcolor=#fefefe
| 135614 ||  || — || May 9, 2002 || Socorro || LINEAR || FLO || align=right | 1.3 km || 
|-id=615 bgcolor=#fefefe
| 135615 ||  || — || May 9, 2002 || Socorro || LINEAR || NYS || align=right | 1.1 km || 
|-id=616 bgcolor=#fefefe
| 135616 ||  || — || May 9, 2002 || Desert Eagle || W. K. Y. Yeung || NYS || align=right data-sort-value="0.95" | 950 m || 
|-id=617 bgcolor=#fefefe
| 135617 ||  || — || May 9, 2002 || Socorro || LINEAR || — || align=right | 1.4 km || 
|-id=618 bgcolor=#fefefe
| 135618 ||  || — || May 9, 2002 || Socorro || LINEAR || — || align=right | 1.4 km || 
|-id=619 bgcolor=#fefefe
| 135619 ||  || — || May 9, 2002 || Socorro || LINEAR || NYS || align=right | 1.2 km || 
|-id=620 bgcolor=#fefefe
| 135620 ||  || — || May 9, 2002 || Socorro || LINEAR || V || align=right | 1.2 km || 
|-id=621 bgcolor=#fefefe
| 135621 ||  || — || May 8, 2002 || Socorro || LINEAR || — || align=right | 1.6 km || 
|-id=622 bgcolor=#fefefe
| 135622 ||  || — || May 8, 2002 || Socorro || LINEAR || — || align=right | 3.2 km || 
|-id=623 bgcolor=#fefefe
| 135623 ||  || — || May 9, 2002 || Socorro || LINEAR || H || align=right | 1.1 km || 
|-id=624 bgcolor=#fefefe
| 135624 ||  || — || May 7, 2002 || Socorro || LINEAR || V || align=right | 1.1 km || 
|-id=625 bgcolor=#fefefe
| 135625 ||  || — || May 8, 2002 || Socorro || LINEAR || — || align=right | 1.4 km || 
|-id=626 bgcolor=#fefefe
| 135626 ||  || — || May 8, 2002 || Socorro || LINEAR || V || align=right | 1.2 km || 
|-id=627 bgcolor=#fefefe
| 135627 ||  || — || May 11, 2002 || Socorro || LINEAR || — || align=right | 1.4 km || 
|-id=628 bgcolor=#fefefe
| 135628 ||  || — || May 11, 2002 || Socorro || LINEAR || FLO || align=right | 1.00 km || 
|-id=629 bgcolor=#fefefe
| 135629 ||  || — || May 11, 2002 || Socorro || LINEAR || V || align=right | 1.4 km || 
|-id=630 bgcolor=#fefefe
| 135630 ||  || — || May 11, 2002 || Socorro || LINEAR || V || align=right | 1.1 km || 
|-id=631 bgcolor=#fefefe
| 135631 ||  || — || May 11, 2002 || Socorro || LINEAR || V || align=right | 1.2 km || 
|-id=632 bgcolor=#fefefe
| 135632 ||  || — || May 11, 2002 || Socorro || LINEAR || — || align=right | 1.9 km || 
|-id=633 bgcolor=#fefefe
| 135633 ||  || — || May 11, 2002 || Socorro || LINEAR || — || align=right | 1.0 km || 
|-id=634 bgcolor=#fefefe
| 135634 ||  || — || May 11, 2002 || Socorro || LINEAR || V || align=right | 1.1 km || 
|-id=635 bgcolor=#fefefe
| 135635 ||  || — || May 11, 2002 || Socorro || LINEAR || V || align=right data-sort-value="0.93" | 930 m || 
|-id=636 bgcolor=#fefefe
| 135636 ||  || — || May 11, 2002 || Socorro || LINEAR || — || align=right | 1.2 km || 
|-id=637 bgcolor=#fefefe
| 135637 ||  || — || May 11, 2002 || Socorro || LINEAR || NYS || align=right data-sort-value="0.97" | 970 m || 
|-id=638 bgcolor=#fefefe
| 135638 ||  || — || May 11, 2002 || Socorro || LINEAR || FLO || align=right | 1.1 km || 
|-id=639 bgcolor=#fefefe
| 135639 ||  || — || May 11, 2002 || Socorro || LINEAR || NYS || align=right | 1.2 km || 
|-id=640 bgcolor=#fefefe
| 135640 ||  || — || May 8, 2002 || Anderson Mesa || LONEOS || — || align=right | 1.1 km || 
|-id=641 bgcolor=#fefefe
| 135641 ||  || — || May 6, 2002 || Socorro || LINEAR || PHO || align=right | 1.8 km || 
|-id=642 bgcolor=#fefefe
| 135642 ||  || — || May 9, 2002 || Socorro || LINEAR || MAS || align=right | 1.3 km || 
|-id=643 bgcolor=#fefefe
| 135643 ||  || — || May 11, 2002 || Socorro || LINEAR || NYS || align=right data-sort-value="0.90" | 900 m || 
|-id=644 bgcolor=#fefefe
| 135644 ||  || — || May 11, 2002 || Socorro || LINEAR || — || align=right | 1.7 km || 
|-id=645 bgcolor=#fefefe
| 135645 ||  || — || May 9, 2002 || Socorro || LINEAR || FLO || align=right | 1.2 km || 
|-id=646 bgcolor=#fefefe
| 135646 ||  || — || May 9, 2002 || Socorro || LINEAR || FLO || align=right | 1.2 km || 
|-id=647 bgcolor=#E9E9E9
| 135647 ||  || — || May 16, 2002 || Palomar || NEAT || — || align=right | 2.6 km || 
|-id=648 bgcolor=#fefefe
| 135648 ||  || — || May 16, 2002 || Socorro || LINEAR || NYS || align=right | 2.3 km || 
|-id=649 bgcolor=#fefefe
| 135649 ||  || — || May 17, 2002 || Socorro || LINEAR || NYS || align=right data-sort-value="0.96" | 960 m || 
|-id=650 bgcolor=#fefefe
| 135650 ||  || — || June 5, 2002 || Socorro || LINEAR || — || align=right | 3.0 km || 
|-id=651 bgcolor=#fefefe
| 135651 ||  || — || June 1, 2002 || Socorro || LINEAR || — || align=right | 1.3 km || 
|-id=652 bgcolor=#fefefe
| 135652 ||  || — || June 5, 2002 || Socorro || LINEAR || — || align=right | 1.6 km || 
|-id=653 bgcolor=#fefefe
| 135653 ||  || — || June 5, 2002 || Socorro || LINEAR || NYS || align=right | 1.5 km || 
|-id=654 bgcolor=#fefefe
| 135654 ||  || — || June 6, 2002 || Socorro || LINEAR || — || align=right | 1.8 km || 
|-id=655 bgcolor=#fefefe
| 135655 ||  || — || June 6, 2002 || Socorro || LINEAR || — || align=right | 2.3 km || 
|-id=656 bgcolor=#fefefe
| 135656 ||  || — || June 7, 2002 || Socorro || LINEAR || V || align=right | 1.1 km || 
|-id=657 bgcolor=#fefefe
| 135657 ||  || — || June 9, 2002 || Socorro || LINEAR || V || align=right | 1.1 km || 
|-id=658 bgcolor=#E9E9E9
| 135658 ||  || — || June 12, 2002 || Socorro || LINEAR || — || align=right | 3.5 km || 
|-id=659 bgcolor=#fefefe
| 135659 ||  || — || June 9, 2002 || Socorro || LINEAR || — || align=right | 1.4 km || 
|-id=660 bgcolor=#fefefe
| 135660 ||  || — || June 12, 2002 || Socorro || LINEAR || — || align=right | 4.7 km || 
|-id=661 bgcolor=#E9E9E9
| 135661 ||  || — || June 10, 2002 || Socorro || LINEAR || — || align=right | 6.2 km || 
|-id=662 bgcolor=#E9E9E9
| 135662 ||  || — || June 19, 2002 || Campo Imperatore || CINEOS || — || align=right | 5.1 km || 
|-id=663 bgcolor=#fefefe
| 135663 ||  || — || July 5, 2002 || Reedy Creek || J. Broughton || — || align=right | 1.7 km || 
|-id=664 bgcolor=#fefefe
| 135664 ||  || — || July 3, 2002 || Palomar || NEAT || — || align=right | 1.4 km || 
|-id=665 bgcolor=#fefefe
| 135665 ||  || — || July 4, 2002 || Palomar || NEAT || NYS || align=right | 1.6 km || 
|-id=666 bgcolor=#fefefe
| 135666 ||  || — || July 4, 2002 || Palomar || NEAT || V || align=right | 1.7 km || 
|-id=667 bgcolor=#E9E9E9
| 135667 ||  || — || July 9, 2002 || Socorro || LINEAR || — || align=right | 3.5 km || 
|-id=668 bgcolor=#E9E9E9
| 135668 ||  || — || July 9, 2002 || Socorro || LINEAR || — || align=right | 2.2 km || 
|-id=669 bgcolor=#d6d6d6
| 135669 ||  || — || July 9, 2002 || Socorro || LINEAR || HYG || align=right | 5.5 km || 
|-id=670 bgcolor=#E9E9E9
| 135670 ||  || — || July 9, 2002 || Socorro || LINEAR || MAR || align=right | 2.3 km || 
|-id=671 bgcolor=#E9E9E9
| 135671 ||  || — || July 9, 2002 || Socorro || LINEAR || — || align=right | 4.9 km || 
|-id=672 bgcolor=#fefefe
| 135672 ||  || — || July 9, 2002 || Socorro || LINEAR || — || align=right | 1.6 km || 
|-id=673 bgcolor=#E9E9E9
| 135673 ||  || — || July 9, 2002 || Socorro || LINEAR || — || align=right | 1.4 km || 
|-id=674 bgcolor=#fefefe
| 135674 ||  || — || July 15, 2002 || Reedy Creek || J. Broughton || NYS || align=right | 3.6 km || 
|-id=675 bgcolor=#E9E9E9
| 135675 ||  || — || July 9, 2002 || Palomar || NEAT || EUN || align=right | 2.5 km || 
|-id=676 bgcolor=#fefefe
| 135676 ||  || — || July 14, 2002 || Palomar || NEAT || NYS || align=right | 1.1 km || 
|-id=677 bgcolor=#fefefe
| 135677 ||  || — || July 14, 2002 || Palomar || NEAT || — || align=right | 1.4 km || 
|-id=678 bgcolor=#fefefe
| 135678 ||  || — || July 15, 2002 || Palomar || NEAT || — || align=right | 1.6 km || 
|-id=679 bgcolor=#fefefe
| 135679 ||  || — || July 14, 2002 || Socorro || LINEAR || MAS || align=right | 1.5 km || 
|-id=680 bgcolor=#fefefe
| 135680 ||  || — || July 5, 2002 || Socorro || LINEAR || — || align=right | 1.6 km || 
|-id=681 bgcolor=#fefefe
| 135681 ||  || — || July 9, 2002 || Socorro || LINEAR || CHL || align=right | 3.4 km || 
|-id=682 bgcolor=#E9E9E9
| 135682 ||  || — || July 17, 2002 || Socorro || LINEAR || — || align=right | 4.1 km || 
|-id=683 bgcolor=#E9E9E9
| 135683 ||  || — || July 17, 2002 || Socorro || LINEAR || — || align=right | 5.1 km || 
|-id=684 bgcolor=#fefefe
| 135684 ||  || — || July 18, 2002 || Needville || Needville Obs. || V || align=right | 1.2 km || 
|-id=685 bgcolor=#E9E9E9
| 135685 ||  || — || July 20, 2002 || Palomar || NEAT || — || align=right | 1.7 km || 
|-id=686 bgcolor=#fefefe
| 135686 ||  || — || July 18, 2002 || Palomar || NEAT || MAS || align=right | 1.4 km || 
|-id=687 bgcolor=#d6d6d6
| 135687 ||  || — || July 17, 2002 || Socorro || LINEAR || ALA || align=right | 7.8 km || 
|-id=688 bgcolor=#E9E9E9
| 135688 ||  || — || July 18, 2002 || Socorro || LINEAR || — || align=right | 1.9 km || 
|-id=689 bgcolor=#E9E9E9
| 135689 ||  || — || July 18, 2002 || Socorro || LINEAR || MAR || align=right | 2.6 km || 
|-id=690 bgcolor=#fefefe
| 135690 ||  || — || July 18, 2002 || Socorro || LINEAR || — || align=right | 2.0 km || 
|-id=691 bgcolor=#fefefe
| 135691 ||  || — || July 22, 2002 || Palomar || NEAT || — || align=right | 3.4 km || 
|-id=692 bgcolor=#E9E9E9
| 135692 ||  || — || July 30, 2002 || Haleakala || A. Lowe || — || align=right | 2.0 km || 
|-id=693 bgcolor=#E9E9E9
| 135693 ||  || — || July 23, 2002 || Palomar || NEAT || — || align=right | 1.6 km || 
|-id=694 bgcolor=#E9E9E9
| 135694 ||  || — || July 21, 2002 || Palomar || NEAT || — || align=right | 1.8 km || 
|-id=695 bgcolor=#fefefe
| 135695 || 2002 PK || — || August 1, 2002 || Campo Imperatore || CINEOS || — || align=right | 1.9 km || 
|-id=696 bgcolor=#fefefe
| 135696 ||  || — || August 4, 2002 || Palomar || NEAT || — || align=right | 2.9 km || 
|-id=697 bgcolor=#fefefe
| 135697 ||  || — || August 6, 2002 || Palomar || NEAT || — || align=right | 1.4 km || 
|-id=698 bgcolor=#d6d6d6
| 135698 ||  || — || August 6, 2002 || Palomar || NEAT || — || align=right | 4.1 km || 
|-id=699 bgcolor=#fefefe
| 135699 ||  || — || August 6, 2002 || Palomar || NEAT || MAS || align=right | 1.1 km || 
|-id=700 bgcolor=#E9E9E9
| 135700 ||  || — || August 6, 2002 || Palomar || NEAT || — || align=right | 4.2 km || 
|}

135701–135800 

|-bgcolor=#E9E9E9
| 135701 ||  || — || August 6, 2002 || Palomar || NEAT || — || align=right | 1.8 km || 
|-id=702 bgcolor=#fefefe
| 135702 ||  || — || August 6, 2002 || Palomar || NEAT || — || align=right | 1.8 km || 
|-id=703 bgcolor=#E9E9E9
| 135703 ||  || — || August 5, 2002 || Socorro || LINEAR || — || align=right | 2.4 km || 
|-id=704 bgcolor=#fefefe
| 135704 ||  || — || August 7, 2002 || Palomar || NEAT || MAS || align=right | 1.2 km || 
|-id=705 bgcolor=#E9E9E9
| 135705 ||  || — || August 8, 2002 || Palomar || NEAT || — || align=right | 3.3 km || 
|-id=706 bgcolor=#E9E9E9
| 135706 ||  || — || August 5, 2002 || Socorro || LINEAR || MAR || align=right | 3.8 km || 
|-id=707 bgcolor=#E9E9E9
| 135707 ||  || — || August 5, 2002 || Socorro || LINEAR || — || align=right | 2.8 km || 
|-id=708 bgcolor=#E9E9E9
| 135708 ||  || — || August 5, 2002 || Socorro || LINEAR || — || align=right | 4.7 km || 
|-id=709 bgcolor=#E9E9E9
| 135709 ||  || — || August 9, 2002 || Socorro || LINEAR || — || align=right | 2.6 km || 
|-id=710 bgcolor=#E9E9E9
| 135710 ||  || — || August 9, 2002 || Socorro || LINEAR || — || align=right | 3.0 km || 
|-id=711 bgcolor=#E9E9E9
| 135711 ||  || — || August 10, 2002 || Socorro || LINEAR || EUN || align=right | 2.3 km || 
|-id=712 bgcolor=#E9E9E9
| 135712 ||  || — || August 10, 2002 || Socorro || LINEAR || — || align=right | 8.9 km || 
|-id=713 bgcolor=#E9E9E9
| 135713 ||  || — || August 10, 2002 || Socorro || LINEAR || MIT || align=right | 3.6 km || 
|-id=714 bgcolor=#E9E9E9
| 135714 ||  || — || August 10, 2002 || Socorro || LINEAR || — || align=right | 1.9 km || 
|-id=715 bgcolor=#E9E9E9
| 135715 ||  || — || August 9, 2002 || Socorro || LINEAR || EUN || align=right | 2.4 km || 
|-id=716 bgcolor=#fefefe
| 135716 ||  || — || August 9, 2002 || Socorro || LINEAR || — || align=right | 1.8 km || 
|-id=717 bgcolor=#E9E9E9
| 135717 ||  || — || August 10, 2002 || Socorro || LINEAR || — || align=right | 2.0 km || 
|-id=718 bgcolor=#E9E9E9
| 135718 ||  || — || August 11, 2002 || Socorro || LINEAR || MIT || align=right | 6.6 km || 
|-id=719 bgcolor=#fefefe
| 135719 ||  || — || August 6, 2002 || Palomar || NEAT || — || align=right | 1.9 km || 
|-id=720 bgcolor=#E9E9E9
| 135720 ||  || — || August 12, 2002 || Socorro || LINEAR || — || align=right | 2.6 km || 
|-id=721 bgcolor=#E9E9E9
| 135721 ||  || — || August 11, 2002 || Haleakala || NEAT || — || align=right | 2.1 km || 
|-id=722 bgcolor=#E9E9E9
| 135722 ||  || — || August 11, 2002 || Palomar || NEAT || — || align=right | 4.0 km || 
|-id=723 bgcolor=#E9E9E9
| 135723 ||  || — || August 13, 2002 || Socorro || LINEAR || — || align=right | 2.5 km || 
|-id=724 bgcolor=#E9E9E9
| 135724 ||  || — || August 12, 2002 || Haleakala || NEAT || — || align=right | 1.8 km || 
|-id=725 bgcolor=#E9E9E9
| 135725 ||  || — || August 14, 2002 || Socorro || LINEAR || — || align=right | 3.4 km || 
|-id=726 bgcolor=#E9E9E9
| 135726 ||  || — || August 12, 2002 || Socorro || LINEAR || — || align=right | 1.9 km || 
|-id=727 bgcolor=#fefefe
| 135727 ||  || — || August 12, 2002 || Haleakala || NEAT || MAS || align=right | 1.7 km || 
|-id=728 bgcolor=#E9E9E9
| 135728 ||  || — || August 15, 2002 || Socorro || LINEAR || — || align=right | 2.5 km || 
|-id=729 bgcolor=#E9E9E9
| 135729 ||  || — || August 15, 2002 || Socorro || LINEAR || — || align=right | 3.0 km || 
|-id=730 bgcolor=#d6d6d6
| 135730 ||  || — || August 13, 2002 || Anderson Mesa || LONEOS || ALA || align=right | 7.7 km || 
|-id=731 bgcolor=#E9E9E9
| 135731 ||  || — || August 13, 2002 || Kitt Peak || Spacewatch || — || align=right | 1.9 km || 
|-id=732 bgcolor=#fefefe
| 135732 ||  || — || August 14, 2002 || Socorro || LINEAR || NYS || align=right | 1.7 km || 
|-id=733 bgcolor=#E9E9E9
| 135733 ||  || — || August 14, 2002 || Socorro || LINEAR || ADE || align=right | 4.6 km || 
|-id=734 bgcolor=#E9E9E9
| 135734 ||  || — || August 15, 2002 || Anderson Mesa || LONEOS || — || align=right | 4.7 km || 
|-id=735 bgcolor=#E9E9E9
| 135735 ||  || — || August 15, 2002 || Socorro || LINEAR || — || align=right | 2.7 km || 
|-id=736 bgcolor=#E9E9E9
| 135736 ||  || — || August 13, 2002 || Socorro || LINEAR || — || align=right | 2.5 km || 
|-id=737 bgcolor=#E9E9E9
| 135737 ||  || — || August 14, 2002 || Siding Spring || R. H. McNaught || — || align=right | 1.9 km || 
|-id=738 bgcolor=#E9E9E9
| 135738 ||  || — || August 14, 2002 || Siding Spring || R. H. McNaught || — || align=right | 2.4 km || 
|-id=739 bgcolor=#fefefe
| 135739 ||  || — || August 9, 2002 || Cerro Tololo || Cerro Tololo Obs. || — || align=right | 1.4 km || 
|-id=740 bgcolor=#fefefe
| 135740 ||  || — || August 8, 2002 || Palomar || S. F. Hönig || — || align=right | 2.4 km || 
|-id=741 bgcolor=#E9E9E9
| 135741 ||  || — || August 8, 2002 || Palomar || A. Lowe || — || align=right | 2.5 km || 
|-id=742 bgcolor=#C2E0FF
| 135742 ||  || — || August 5, 2002 || Mauna Kea || Mauna Kea Obs. || cubewano (hot) || align=right | 185 km || 
|-id=743 bgcolor=#fefefe
| 135743 ||  || — || August 11, 2002 || Palomar || NEAT || — || align=right | 1.7 km || 
|-id=744 bgcolor=#E9E9E9
| 135744 ||  || — || August 16, 2002 || Haleakala || NEAT || — || align=right | 1.8 km || 
|-id=745 bgcolor=#E9E9E9
| 135745 ||  || — || August 17, 2002 || Tenagra || Tenagra Obs. || — || align=right | 7.7 km || 
|-id=746 bgcolor=#fefefe
| 135746 ||  || — || August 16, 2002 || Palomar || NEAT || — || align=right | 1.7 km || 
|-id=747 bgcolor=#E9E9E9
| 135747 ||  || — || August 19, 2002 || Haleakala || NEAT || — || align=right | 2.4 km || 
|-id=748 bgcolor=#E9E9E9
| 135748 ||  || — || August 24, 2002 || Palomar || NEAT || — || align=right | 2.7 km || 
|-id=749 bgcolor=#E9E9E9
| 135749 ||  || — || August 27, 2002 || Palomar || NEAT || MAR || align=right | 2.2 km || 
|-id=750 bgcolor=#E9E9E9
| 135750 ||  || — || August 26, 2002 || Palomar || NEAT || — || align=right | 2.0 km || 
|-id=751 bgcolor=#E9E9E9
| 135751 ||  || — || August 28, 2002 || Palomar || NEAT || — || align=right | 4.4 km || 
|-id=752 bgcolor=#fefefe
| 135752 ||  || — || August 27, 2002 || Palomar || NEAT || MAS || align=right | 1.1 km || 
|-id=753 bgcolor=#E9E9E9
| 135753 ||  || — || August 30, 2002 || Kitt Peak || Spacewatch || — || align=right | 3.2 km || 
|-id=754 bgcolor=#E9E9E9
| 135754 ||  || — || August 17, 2002 || Palomar || NEAT || MAR || align=right | 1.9 km || 
|-id=755 bgcolor=#fefefe
| 135755 ||  || — || August 16, 2002 || Palomar || NEAT || — || align=right | 1.4 km || 
|-id=756 bgcolor=#E9E9E9
| 135756 || 2002 RN || — || September 2, 2002 || Ondřejov || P. Pravec, P. Kušnirák || — || align=right | 4.5 km || 
|-id=757 bgcolor=#E9E9E9
| 135757 ||  || — || September 4, 2002 || Anderson Mesa || LONEOS || — || align=right | 1.4 km || 
|-id=758 bgcolor=#E9E9E9
| 135758 ||  || — || September 4, 2002 || Anderson Mesa || LONEOS || — || align=right | 1.8 km || 
|-id=759 bgcolor=#E9E9E9
| 135759 ||  || — || September 4, 2002 || Anderson Mesa || LONEOS || — || align=right | 2.1 km || 
|-id=760 bgcolor=#E9E9E9
| 135760 ||  || — || September 4, 2002 || Anderson Mesa || LONEOS || BRU || align=right | 6.9 km || 
|-id=761 bgcolor=#E9E9E9
| 135761 ||  || — || September 4, 2002 || Anderson Mesa || LONEOS || — || align=right | 3.6 km || 
|-id=762 bgcolor=#E9E9E9
| 135762 ||  || — || September 4, 2002 || Anderson Mesa || LONEOS || — || align=right | 2.2 km || 
|-id=763 bgcolor=#E9E9E9
| 135763 ||  || — || September 4, 2002 || Anderson Mesa || LONEOS || — || align=right | 2.9 km || 
|-id=764 bgcolor=#E9E9E9
| 135764 ||  || — || September 5, 2002 || Socorro || LINEAR || — || align=right | 2.9 km || 
|-id=765 bgcolor=#E9E9E9
| 135765 ||  || — || September 3, 2002 || Haleakala || NEAT || RAF || align=right | 1.6 km || 
|-id=766 bgcolor=#E9E9E9
| 135766 ||  || — || September 4, 2002 || Anderson Mesa || LONEOS || — || align=right | 2.2 km || 
|-id=767 bgcolor=#E9E9E9
| 135767 ||  || — || September 4, 2002 || Anderson Mesa || LONEOS || — || align=right | 1.9 km || 
|-id=768 bgcolor=#E9E9E9
| 135768 ||  || — || September 4, 2002 || Anderson Mesa || LONEOS || CLO || align=right | 3.9 km || 
|-id=769 bgcolor=#E9E9E9
| 135769 ||  || — || September 4, 2002 || Anderson Mesa || LONEOS || — || align=right | 5.0 km || 
|-id=770 bgcolor=#E9E9E9
| 135770 ||  || — || September 5, 2002 || Anderson Mesa || LONEOS || RAF || align=right | 1.9 km || 
|-id=771 bgcolor=#E9E9E9
| 135771 ||  || — || September 5, 2002 || Socorro || LINEAR || — || align=right | 2.2 km || 
|-id=772 bgcolor=#E9E9E9
| 135772 ||  || — || September 5, 2002 || Socorro || LINEAR || — || align=right | 1.2 km || 
|-id=773 bgcolor=#E9E9E9
| 135773 ||  || — || September 5, 2002 || Socorro || LINEAR || — || align=right | 3.4 km || 
|-id=774 bgcolor=#E9E9E9
| 135774 ||  || — || September 5, 2002 || Socorro || LINEAR || — || align=right | 3.4 km || 
|-id=775 bgcolor=#E9E9E9
| 135775 ||  || — || September 5, 2002 || Socorro || LINEAR || — || align=right | 3.6 km || 
|-id=776 bgcolor=#E9E9E9
| 135776 ||  || — || September 5, 2002 || Anderson Mesa || LONEOS || — || align=right | 2.7 km || 
|-id=777 bgcolor=#E9E9E9
| 135777 ||  || — || September 5, 2002 || Socorro || LINEAR || — || align=right | 2.0 km || 
|-id=778 bgcolor=#E9E9E9
| 135778 ||  || — || September 5, 2002 || Socorro || LINEAR || MIS || align=right | 5.5 km || 
|-id=779 bgcolor=#E9E9E9
| 135779 ||  || — || September 5, 2002 || Socorro || LINEAR || — || align=right | 2.4 km || 
|-id=780 bgcolor=#E9E9E9
| 135780 ||  || — || September 3, 2002 || Palomar || NEAT || — || align=right | 5.9 km || 
|-id=781 bgcolor=#E9E9E9
| 135781 ||  || — || September 5, 2002 || Socorro || LINEAR || HEN || align=right | 1.8 km || 
|-id=782 bgcolor=#E9E9E9
| 135782 ||  || — || September 5, 2002 || Socorro || LINEAR || — || align=right | 4.2 km || 
|-id=783 bgcolor=#E9E9E9
| 135783 ||  || — || September 5, 2002 || Socorro || LINEAR || — || align=right | 1.6 km || 
|-id=784 bgcolor=#d6d6d6
| 135784 ||  || — || September 5, 2002 || Socorro || LINEAR || THM || align=right | 4.2 km || 
|-id=785 bgcolor=#E9E9E9
| 135785 ||  || — || September 5, 2002 || Socorro || LINEAR || — || align=right | 2.9 km || 
|-id=786 bgcolor=#E9E9E9
| 135786 ||  || — || September 5, 2002 || Socorro || LINEAR || — || align=right | 2.4 km || 
|-id=787 bgcolor=#d6d6d6
| 135787 ||  || — || September 5, 2002 || Socorro || LINEAR || — || align=right | 5.5 km || 
|-id=788 bgcolor=#E9E9E9
| 135788 ||  || — || September 5, 2002 || Socorro || LINEAR || MAR || align=right | 2.7 km || 
|-id=789 bgcolor=#E9E9E9
| 135789 ||  || — || September 5, 2002 || Socorro || LINEAR || — || align=right | 1.6 km || 
|-id=790 bgcolor=#E9E9E9
| 135790 ||  || — || September 5, 2002 || Anderson Mesa || LONEOS || — || align=right | 2.4 km || 
|-id=791 bgcolor=#E9E9E9
| 135791 ||  || — || September 5, 2002 || Socorro || LINEAR || — || align=right | 3.2 km || 
|-id=792 bgcolor=#E9E9E9
| 135792 ||  || — || September 5, 2002 || Socorro || LINEAR || PAD || align=right | 3.3 km || 
|-id=793 bgcolor=#E9E9E9
| 135793 ||  || — || September 5, 2002 || Socorro || LINEAR || — || align=right | 4.4 km || 
|-id=794 bgcolor=#E9E9E9
| 135794 ||  || — || September 5, 2002 || Socorro || LINEAR || — || align=right | 2.5 km || 
|-id=795 bgcolor=#E9E9E9
| 135795 ||  || — || September 5, 2002 || Socorro || LINEAR || — || align=right | 2.7 km || 
|-id=796 bgcolor=#E9E9E9
| 135796 ||  || — || September 5, 2002 || Socorro || LINEAR || EUN || align=right | 2.4 km || 
|-id=797 bgcolor=#E9E9E9
| 135797 ||  || — || September 5, 2002 || Socorro || LINEAR || — || align=right | 2.0 km || 
|-id=798 bgcolor=#E9E9E9
| 135798 ||  || — || September 5, 2002 || Socorro || LINEAR || — || align=right | 2.0 km || 
|-id=799 bgcolor=#E9E9E9
| 135799 Ráczmiklós ||  ||  || September 7, 2002 || Piszkéstető || K. Sárneczky || — || align=right | 1.6 km || 
|-id=800 bgcolor=#E9E9E9
| 135800 ||  || — || September 6, 2002 || Socorro || LINEAR || — || align=right | 3.5 km || 
|}

135801–135900 

|-bgcolor=#E9E9E9
| 135801 ||  || — || September 6, 2002 || Socorro || LINEAR || ADE || align=right | 3.1 km || 
|-id=802 bgcolor=#E9E9E9
| 135802 ||  || — || September 3, 2002 || Palomar || NEAT || HNS || align=right | 2.2 km || 
|-id=803 bgcolor=#E9E9E9
| 135803 ||  || — || September 6, 2002 || Socorro || LINEAR || MAR || align=right | 1.7 km || 
|-id=804 bgcolor=#E9E9E9
| 135804 ||  || — || September 6, 2002 || Socorro || LINEAR || — || align=right | 3.0 km || 
|-id=805 bgcolor=#E9E9E9
| 135805 ||  || — || September 7, 2002 || Socorro || LINEAR || INO || align=right | 3.4 km || 
|-id=806 bgcolor=#E9E9E9
| 135806 ||  || — || September 8, 2002 || Haleakala || NEAT || — || align=right | 3.1 km || 
|-id=807 bgcolor=#E9E9E9
| 135807 ||  || — || September 11, 2002 || Palomar || NEAT || — || align=right | 1.9 km || 
|-id=808 bgcolor=#E9E9E9
| 135808 ||  || — || September 10, 2002 || Haleakala || NEAT || MAR || align=right | 2.7 km || 
|-id=809 bgcolor=#E9E9E9
| 135809 ||  || — || September 11, 2002 || Haleakala || NEAT || ADE || align=right | 3.0 km || 
|-id=810 bgcolor=#E9E9E9
| 135810 ||  || — || September 11, 2002 || Palomar || NEAT || MRX || align=right | 2.1 km || 
|-id=811 bgcolor=#E9E9E9
| 135811 ||  || — || September 11, 2002 || Palomar || NEAT || — || align=right | 4.1 km || 
|-id=812 bgcolor=#E9E9E9
| 135812 ||  || — || September 13, 2002 || Palomar || NEAT || MIS || align=right | 2.6 km || 
|-id=813 bgcolor=#E9E9E9
| 135813 ||  || — || September 13, 2002 || Palomar || NEAT || — || align=right | 2.0 km || 
|-id=814 bgcolor=#E9E9E9
| 135814 ||  || — || September 13, 2002 || Kitt Peak || Spacewatch || — || align=right | 2.0 km || 
|-id=815 bgcolor=#E9E9E9
| 135815 ||  || — || September 12, 2002 || Palomar || NEAT || — || align=right | 3.0 km || 
|-id=816 bgcolor=#E9E9E9
| 135816 ||  || — || September 12, 2002 || Palomar || NEAT || — || align=right | 3.5 km || 
|-id=817 bgcolor=#E9E9E9
| 135817 ||  || — || September 13, 2002 || Palomar || NEAT || — || align=right | 4.3 km || 
|-id=818 bgcolor=#E9E9E9
| 135818 ||  || — || September 13, 2002 || Palomar || NEAT || WIT || align=right | 1.8 km || 
|-id=819 bgcolor=#E9E9E9
| 135819 ||  || — || September 13, 2002 || Socorro || LINEAR || — || align=right | 1.5 km || 
|-id=820 bgcolor=#E9E9E9
| 135820 ||  || — || September 13, 2002 || Palomar || NEAT || ADE || align=right | 3.4 km || 
|-id=821 bgcolor=#E9E9E9
| 135821 ||  || — || September 14, 2002 || Palomar || NEAT || — || align=right | 1.5 km || 
|-id=822 bgcolor=#E9E9E9
| 135822 ||  || — || September 12, 2002 || Palomar || NEAT || — || align=right | 2.0 km || 
|-id=823 bgcolor=#E9E9E9
| 135823 ||  || — || September 13, 2002 || Haleakala || NEAT || — || align=right | 1.4 km || 
|-id=824 bgcolor=#E9E9E9
| 135824 ||  || — || September 14, 2002 || Palomar || NEAT || — || align=right | 1.3 km || 
|-id=825 bgcolor=#E9E9E9
| 135825 ||  || — || September 13, 2002 || Palomar || NEAT || HEN || align=right | 2.0 km || 
|-id=826 bgcolor=#E9E9E9
| 135826 ||  || — || September 14, 2002 || Palomar || NEAT || — || align=right | 1.4 km || 
|-id=827 bgcolor=#E9E9E9
| 135827 ||  || — || September 14, 2002 || Haleakala || NEAT || MAR || align=right | 1.6 km || 
|-id=828 bgcolor=#E9E9E9
| 135828 ||  || — || September 14, 2002 || Haleakala || NEAT || — || align=right | 2.7 km || 
|-id=829 bgcolor=#E9E9E9
| 135829 ||  || — || September 14, 2002 || Palomar || R. Matson || — || align=right | 1.3 km || 
|-id=830 bgcolor=#E9E9E9
| 135830 ||  || — || September 13, 2002 || Palomar || R. Matson || — || align=right | 1.8 km || 
|-id=831 bgcolor=#E9E9E9
| 135831 ||  || — || September 1, 2002 || Haleakala || NEAT || — || align=right | 1.9 km || 
|-id=832 bgcolor=#E9E9E9
| 135832 ||  || — || September 5, 2002 || Haleakala || NEAT || — || align=right | 1.7 km || 
|-id=833 bgcolor=#E9E9E9
| 135833 ||  || — || September 14, 2002 || Palomar || NEAT || — || align=right | 1.4 km || 
|-id=834 bgcolor=#E9E9E9
| 135834 || 2002 SO || — || September 21, 2002 || Pla D'Arguines || R. Ferrando || MAR || align=right | 3.0 km || 
|-id=835 bgcolor=#E9E9E9
| 135835 ||  || — || September 26, 2002 || Palomar || NEAT || — || align=right | 2.8 km || 
|-id=836 bgcolor=#E9E9E9
| 135836 ||  || — || September 27, 2002 || Palomar || NEAT || HEN || align=right | 2.4 km || 
|-id=837 bgcolor=#d6d6d6
| 135837 ||  || — || September 27, 2002 || Palomar || NEAT || — || align=right | 5.1 km || 
|-id=838 bgcolor=#E9E9E9
| 135838 ||  || — || September 27, 2002 || Anderson Mesa || LONEOS || PAD || align=right | 4.5 km || 
|-id=839 bgcolor=#E9E9E9
| 135839 ||  || — || September 26, 2002 || Palomar || NEAT || WIT || align=right | 1.8 km || 
|-id=840 bgcolor=#E9E9E9
| 135840 ||  || — || September 28, 2002 || Haleakala || NEAT || — || align=right | 2.8 km || 
|-id=841 bgcolor=#E9E9E9
| 135841 ||  || — || September 28, 2002 || Haleakala || NEAT || — || align=right | 5.1 km || 
|-id=842 bgcolor=#E9E9E9
| 135842 ||  || — || September 28, 2002 || Haleakala || NEAT || — || align=right | 2.7 km || 
|-id=843 bgcolor=#E9E9E9
| 135843 ||  || — || September 28, 2002 || Haleakala || NEAT || — || align=right | 1.7 km || 
|-id=844 bgcolor=#E9E9E9
| 135844 ||  || — || September 28, 2002 || Haleakala || NEAT || — || align=right | 2.6 km || 
|-id=845 bgcolor=#E9E9E9
| 135845 ||  || — || September 28, 2002 || Haleakala || NEAT || MAR || align=right | 2.0 km || 
|-id=846 bgcolor=#E9E9E9
| 135846 ||  || — || September 29, 2002 || Haleakala || NEAT || — || align=right | 2.1 km || 
|-id=847 bgcolor=#fefefe
| 135847 ||  || — || September 30, 2002 || Socorro || LINEAR || — || align=right | 1.5 km || 
|-id=848 bgcolor=#E9E9E9
| 135848 ||  || — || September 28, 2002 || Haleakala || NEAT || — || align=right | 2.2 km || 
|-id=849 bgcolor=#E9E9E9
| 135849 ||  || — || September 28, 2002 || Haleakala || NEAT || — || align=right | 3.4 km || 
|-id=850 bgcolor=#E9E9E9
| 135850 ||  || — || September 28, 2002 || Haleakala || NEAT || — || align=right | 4.5 km || 
|-id=851 bgcolor=#E9E9E9
| 135851 ||  || — || September 29, 2002 || Haleakala || NEAT || MIT || align=right | 4.5 km || 
|-id=852 bgcolor=#E9E9E9
| 135852 ||  || — || September 30, 2002 || Haleakala || NEAT || — || align=right | 2.2 km || 
|-id=853 bgcolor=#E9E9E9
| 135853 ||  || — || September 17, 2002 || Palomar || NEAT || — || align=right | 3.1 km || 
|-id=854 bgcolor=#E9E9E9
| 135854 ||  || — || September 18, 2002 || Palomar || NEAT || — || align=right | 2.9 km || 
|-id=855 bgcolor=#E9E9E9
| 135855 ||  || — || September 20, 2002 || Palomar || NEAT || EUN || align=right | 2.9 km || 
|-id=856 bgcolor=#d6d6d6
| 135856 ||  || — || September 30, 2002 || Socorro || LINEAR || CHA || align=right | 4.2 km || 
|-id=857 bgcolor=#E9E9E9
| 135857 ||  || — || September 30, 2002 || Haleakala || NEAT || — || align=right | 4.2 km || 
|-id=858 bgcolor=#E9E9E9
| 135858 ||  || — || September 30, 2002 || Haleakala || NEAT || — || align=right | 4.7 km || 
|-id=859 bgcolor=#E9E9E9
| 135859 || 2002 TS || — || October 1, 2002 || Anderson Mesa || LONEOS || — || align=right | 3.3 km || 
|-id=860 bgcolor=#E9E9E9
| 135860 ||  || — || October 1, 2002 || Anderson Mesa || LONEOS || — || align=right | 2.6 km || 
|-id=861 bgcolor=#d6d6d6
| 135861 ||  || — || October 1, 2002 || Anderson Mesa || LONEOS || KOR || align=right | 3.0 km || 
|-id=862 bgcolor=#E9E9E9
| 135862 ||  || — || October 1, 2002 || Anderson Mesa || LONEOS || MIS || align=right | 3.9 km || 
|-id=863 bgcolor=#E9E9E9
| 135863 ||  || — || October 1, 2002 || Socorro || LINEAR || — || align=right | 4.1 km || 
|-id=864 bgcolor=#E9E9E9
| 135864 ||  || — || October 1, 2002 || Socorro || LINEAR || — || align=right | 3.2 km || 
|-id=865 bgcolor=#E9E9E9
| 135865 ||  || — || October 2, 2002 || Socorro || LINEAR || — || align=right | 4.6 km || 
|-id=866 bgcolor=#E9E9E9
| 135866 ||  || — || October 2, 2002 || Socorro || LINEAR || — || align=right | 2.9 km || 
|-id=867 bgcolor=#E9E9E9
| 135867 ||  || — || October 2, 2002 || Socorro || LINEAR || NEM || align=right | 3.2 km || 
|-id=868 bgcolor=#E9E9E9
| 135868 ||  || — || October 2, 2002 || Socorro || LINEAR || — || align=right | 3.3 km || 
|-id=869 bgcolor=#E9E9E9
| 135869 ||  || — || October 2, 2002 || Socorro || LINEAR || HOF || align=right | 4.9 km || 
|-id=870 bgcolor=#E9E9E9
| 135870 ||  || — || October 2, 2002 || Socorro || LINEAR || HEN || align=right | 1.9 km || 
|-id=871 bgcolor=#E9E9E9
| 135871 ||  || — || October 2, 2002 || Socorro || LINEAR || HEN || align=right | 2.3 km || 
|-id=872 bgcolor=#d6d6d6
| 135872 ||  || — || October 2, 2002 || Socorro || LINEAR || — || align=right | 5.1 km || 
|-id=873 bgcolor=#E9E9E9
| 135873 ||  || — || October 2, 2002 || Socorro || LINEAR || RAF || align=right | 1.6 km || 
|-id=874 bgcolor=#E9E9E9
| 135874 ||  || — || October 2, 2002 || Socorro || LINEAR || — || align=right | 4.5 km || 
|-id=875 bgcolor=#E9E9E9
| 135875 ||  || — || October 2, 2002 || Socorro || LINEAR || — || align=right | 4.0 km || 
|-id=876 bgcolor=#E9E9E9
| 135876 ||  || — || October 2, 2002 || Socorro || LINEAR || AGN || align=right | 1.9 km || 
|-id=877 bgcolor=#fefefe
| 135877 ||  || — || October 2, 2002 || Socorro || LINEAR || — || align=right | 1.6 km || 
|-id=878 bgcolor=#E9E9E9
| 135878 ||  || — || October 2, 2002 || Socorro || LINEAR || — || align=right | 1.8 km || 
|-id=879 bgcolor=#E9E9E9
| 135879 ||  || — || October 2, 2002 || Socorro || LINEAR || GEF || align=right | 2.4 km || 
|-id=880 bgcolor=#E9E9E9
| 135880 ||  || — || October 2, 2002 || Socorro || LINEAR || — || align=right | 3.5 km || 
|-id=881 bgcolor=#E9E9E9
| 135881 ||  || — || October 2, 2002 || Socorro || LINEAR || — || align=right | 5.1 km || 
|-id=882 bgcolor=#E9E9E9
| 135882 ||  || — || October 2, 2002 || Socorro || LINEAR || PAD || align=right | 3.9 km || 
|-id=883 bgcolor=#E9E9E9
| 135883 ||  || — || October 2, 2002 || Socorro || LINEAR || — || align=right | 4.4 km || 
|-id=884 bgcolor=#E9E9E9
| 135884 ||  || — || October 2, 2002 || Socorro || LINEAR || — || align=right | 5.1 km || 
|-id=885 bgcolor=#E9E9E9
| 135885 ||  || — || October 2, 2002 || Socorro || LINEAR || — || align=right | 2.7 km || 
|-id=886 bgcolor=#E9E9E9
| 135886 ||  || — || October 2, 2002 || Socorro || LINEAR || — || align=right | 2.5 km || 
|-id=887 bgcolor=#E9E9E9
| 135887 ||  || — || October 2, 2002 || Socorro || LINEAR || DOR || align=right | 6.1 km || 
|-id=888 bgcolor=#E9E9E9
| 135888 ||  || — || October 2, 2002 || Socorro || LINEAR || MRX || align=right | 2.3 km || 
|-id=889 bgcolor=#E9E9E9
| 135889 ||  || — || October 3, 2002 || Campo Imperatore || CINEOS || CLO || align=right | 3.9 km || 
|-id=890 bgcolor=#E9E9E9
| 135890 ||  || — || October 3, 2002 || Campo Imperatore || CINEOS || — || align=right | 5.1 km || 
|-id=891 bgcolor=#E9E9E9
| 135891 ||  || — || October 4, 2002 || Fountain Hills || C. W. Juels, P. R. Holvorcem || — || align=right | 2.2 km || 
|-id=892 bgcolor=#E9E9E9
| 135892 ||  || — || October 4, 2002 || Campo Imperatore || CINEOS || HEN || align=right | 2.0 km || 
|-id=893 bgcolor=#E9E9E9
| 135893 ||  || — || October 3, 2002 || Palomar || NEAT || — || align=right | 2.1 km || 
|-id=894 bgcolor=#E9E9E9
| 135894 ||  || — || October 3, 2002 || Palomar || NEAT || — || align=right | 1.7 km || 
|-id=895 bgcolor=#E9E9E9
| 135895 ||  || — || October 3, 2002 || Palomar || NEAT || — || align=right | 5.5 km || 
|-id=896 bgcolor=#E9E9E9
| 135896 ||  || — || October 1, 2002 || Anderson Mesa || LONEOS || NEM || align=right | 4.8 km || 
|-id=897 bgcolor=#E9E9E9
| 135897 ||  || — || October 1, 2002 || Anderson Mesa || LONEOS || — || align=right | 3.5 km || 
|-id=898 bgcolor=#E9E9E9
| 135898 ||  || — || October 1, 2002 || Anderson Mesa || LONEOS || — || align=right | 4.5 km || 
|-id=899 bgcolor=#E9E9E9
| 135899 ||  || — || October 1, 2002 || Anderson Mesa || LONEOS || — || align=right | 3.1 km || 
|-id=900 bgcolor=#E9E9E9
| 135900 ||  || — || October 1, 2002 || Anderson Mesa || LONEOS || — || align=right | 2.2 km || 
|}

135901–136000 

|-bgcolor=#E9E9E9
| 135901 ||  || — || October 1, 2002 || Anderson Mesa || LONEOS || — || align=right | 3.0 km || 
|-id=902 bgcolor=#E9E9E9
| 135902 ||  || — || October 2, 2002 || Haleakala || NEAT || — || align=right | 2.8 km || 
|-id=903 bgcolor=#E9E9E9
| 135903 ||  || — || October 3, 2002 || Palomar || NEAT || WIT || align=right | 1.7 km || 
|-id=904 bgcolor=#d6d6d6
| 135904 ||  || — || October 3, 2002 || Palomar || NEAT || — || align=right | 5.8 km || 
|-id=905 bgcolor=#E9E9E9
| 135905 ||  || — || October 3, 2002 || Palomar || NEAT || — || align=right | 4.4 km || 
|-id=906 bgcolor=#E9E9E9
| 135906 ||  || — || October 3, 2002 || Palomar || NEAT || — || align=right | 1.6 km || 
|-id=907 bgcolor=#E9E9E9
| 135907 ||  || — || October 4, 2002 || Socorro || LINEAR || — || align=right | 2.8 km || 
|-id=908 bgcolor=#E9E9E9
| 135908 ||  || — || October 4, 2002 || Socorro || LINEAR || AGN || align=right | 2.1 km || 
|-id=909 bgcolor=#E9E9E9
| 135909 ||  || — || October 4, 2002 || Anderson Mesa || LONEOS || ADE || align=right | 4.2 km || 
|-id=910 bgcolor=#E9E9E9
| 135910 ||  || — || October 2, 2002 || Campo Imperatore || CINEOS || — || align=right | 2.8 km || 
|-id=911 bgcolor=#E9E9E9
| 135911 ||  || — || October 3, 2002 || Palomar || NEAT || — || align=right | 4.7 km || 
|-id=912 bgcolor=#E9E9E9
| 135912 ||  || — || October 3, 2002 || Palomar || NEAT || DOR || align=right | 6.7 km || 
|-id=913 bgcolor=#E9E9E9
| 135913 ||  || — || October 4, 2002 || Anderson Mesa || LONEOS || — || align=right | 4.6 km || 
|-id=914 bgcolor=#d6d6d6
| 135914 ||  || — || October 4, 2002 || Anderson Mesa || LONEOS || — || align=right | 7.3 km || 
|-id=915 bgcolor=#d6d6d6
| 135915 ||  || — || October 4, 2002 || Anderson Mesa || LONEOS || — || align=right | 5.2 km || 
|-id=916 bgcolor=#fefefe
| 135916 ||  || — || October 4, 2002 || Anderson Mesa || LONEOS || — || align=right | 2.4 km || 
|-id=917 bgcolor=#E9E9E9
| 135917 ||  || — || October 4, 2002 || Palomar || NEAT || PAD || align=right | 2.6 km || 
|-id=918 bgcolor=#E9E9E9
| 135918 ||  || — || October 5, 2002 || Palomar || NEAT || ADE || align=right | 5.1 km || 
|-id=919 bgcolor=#d6d6d6
| 135919 ||  || — || October 5, 2002 || Palomar || NEAT || — || align=right | 5.0 km || 
|-id=920 bgcolor=#E9E9E9
| 135920 ||  || — || October 5, 2002 || Palomar || NEAT || — || align=right | 3.3 km || 
|-id=921 bgcolor=#E9E9E9
| 135921 ||  || — || October 3, 2002 || Palomar || NEAT || — || align=right | 3.2 km || 
|-id=922 bgcolor=#E9E9E9
| 135922 ||  || — || October 3, 2002 || Palomar || NEAT || — || align=right | 4.2 km || 
|-id=923 bgcolor=#E9E9E9
| 135923 ||  || — || October 3, 2002 || Palomar || NEAT || — || align=right | 5.1 km || 
|-id=924 bgcolor=#E9E9E9
| 135924 ||  || — || October 4, 2002 || Socorro || LINEAR || — || align=right | 4.8 km || 
|-id=925 bgcolor=#E9E9E9
| 135925 ||  || — || October 4, 2002 || Anderson Mesa || LONEOS || — || align=right | 2.9 km || 
|-id=926 bgcolor=#E9E9E9
| 135926 ||  || — || October 14, 2002 || Socorro || LINEAR || AGN || align=right | 2.4 km || 
|-id=927 bgcolor=#E9E9E9
| 135927 ||  || — || October 14, 2002 || Socorro || LINEAR || JUN || align=right | 3.1 km || 
|-id=928 bgcolor=#E9E9E9
| 135928 ||  || — || October 14, 2002 || Socorro || LINEAR || ADE || align=right | 5.9 km || 
|-id=929 bgcolor=#E9E9E9
| 135929 ||  || — || October 14, 2002 || Socorro || LINEAR || — || align=right | 3.8 km || 
|-id=930 bgcolor=#E9E9E9
| 135930 ||  || — || October 4, 2002 || Palomar || NEAT || — || align=right | 5.1 km || 
|-id=931 bgcolor=#E9E9E9
| 135931 ||  || — || October 4, 2002 || Socorro || LINEAR || — || align=right | 4.1 km || 
|-id=932 bgcolor=#E9E9E9
| 135932 ||  || — || October 4, 2002 || Socorro || LINEAR || — || align=right | 2.9 km || 
|-id=933 bgcolor=#E9E9E9
| 135933 ||  || — || October 4, 2002 || Socorro || LINEAR || — || align=right | 5.2 km || 
|-id=934 bgcolor=#E9E9E9
| 135934 ||  || — || October 4, 2002 || Socorro || LINEAR || — || align=right | 3.4 km || 
|-id=935 bgcolor=#E9E9E9
| 135935 ||  || — || October 4, 2002 || Socorro || LINEAR || — || align=right | 1.7 km || 
|-id=936 bgcolor=#E9E9E9
| 135936 ||  || — || October 11, 2002 || Essen || Walter Hohmann Obs. || EUN || align=right | 3.1 km || 
|-id=937 bgcolor=#E9E9E9
| 135937 ||  || — || October 1, 2002 || Socorro || LINEAR || — || align=right | 4.7 km || 
|-id=938 bgcolor=#E9E9E9
| 135938 ||  || — || October 5, 2002 || Anderson Mesa || LONEOS || — || align=right | 1.6 km || 
|-id=939 bgcolor=#E9E9E9
| 135939 ||  || — || October 5, 2002 || Anderson Mesa || LONEOS || — || align=right | 3.6 km || 
|-id=940 bgcolor=#E9E9E9
| 135940 ||  || — || October 3, 2002 || Socorro || LINEAR || — || align=right | 2.0 km || 
|-id=941 bgcolor=#E9E9E9
| 135941 ||  || — || October 3, 2002 || Socorro || LINEAR || — || align=right | 3.4 km || 
|-id=942 bgcolor=#E9E9E9
| 135942 ||  || — || October 4, 2002 || Socorro || LINEAR || — || align=right | 3.1 km || 
|-id=943 bgcolor=#E9E9E9
| 135943 ||  || — || October 4, 2002 || Socorro || LINEAR || — || align=right | 2.4 km || 
|-id=944 bgcolor=#E9E9E9
| 135944 ||  || — || October 4, 2002 || Socorro || LINEAR || — || align=right | 2.9 km || 
|-id=945 bgcolor=#E9E9E9
| 135945 ||  || — || October 4, 2002 || Socorro || LINEAR || — || align=right | 1.7 km || 
|-id=946 bgcolor=#E9E9E9
| 135946 ||  || — || October 6, 2002 || Haleakala || NEAT || EUN || align=right | 2.1 km || 
|-id=947 bgcolor=#E9E9E9
| 135947 ||  || — || October 6, 2002 || Haleakala || NEAT || — || align=right | 3.1 km || 
|-id=948 bgcolor=#E9E9E9
| 135948 ||  || — || October 4, 2002 || Socorro || LINEAR || — || align=right | 4.6 km || 
|-id=949 bgcolor=#E9E9E9
| 135949 ||  || — || October 5, 2002 || Socorro || LINEAR || — || align=right | 2.3 km || 
|-id=950 bgcolor=#E9E9E9
| 135950 ||  || — || October 8, 2002 || Anderson Mesa || LONEOS || — || align=right | 2.0 km || 
|-id=951 bgcolor=#E9E9E9
| 135951 ||  || — || October 8, 2002 || Anderson Mesa || LONEOS || — || align=right | 2.9 km || 
|-id=952 bgcolor=#E9E9E9
| 135952 ||  || — || October 8, 2002 || Anderson Mesa || LONEOS || JUN || align=right | 1.9 km || 
|-id=953 bgcolor=#E9E9E9
| 135953 ||  || — || October 8, 2002 || Anderson Mesa || LONEOS || — || align=right | 3.1 km || 
|-id=954 bgcolor=#E9E9E9
| 135954 ||  || — || October 6, 2002 || Socorro || LINEAR || — || align=right | 2.4 km || 
|-id=955 bgcolor=#E9E9E9
| 135955 ||  || — || October 6, 2002 || Socorro || LINEAR || ADE || align=right | 6.2 km || 
|-id=956 bgcolor=#E9E9E9
| 135956 ||  || — || October 7, 2002 || Socorro || LINEAR || MIT || align=right | 4.6 km || 
|-id=957 bgcolor=#E9E9E9
| 135957 ||  || — || October 9, 2002 || Socorro || LINEAR || — || align=right | 2.8 km || 
|-id=958 bgcolor=#E9E9E9
| 135958 ||  || — || October 7, 2002 || Haleakala || NEAT || HOF || align=right | 4.8 km || 
|-id=959 bgcolor=#E9E9E9
| 135959 ||  || — || October 9, 2002 || Socorro || LINEAR || — || align=right | 4.4 km || 
|-id=960 bgcolor=#E9E9E9
| 135960 ||  || — || October 9, 2002 || Socorro || LINEAR || HEN || align=right | 2.1 km || 
|-id=961 bgcolor=#E9E9E9
| 135961 ||  || — || October 9, 2002 || Socorro || LINEAR || WIT || align=right | 1.9 km || 
|-id=962 bgcolor=#E9E9E9
| 135962 ||  || — || October 9, 2002 || Socorro || LINEAR || — || align=right | 4.8 km || 
|-id=963 bgcolor=#d6d6d6
| 135963 ||  || — || October 10, 2002 || Socorro || LINEAR || — || align=right | 4.9 km || 
|-id=964 bgcolor=#d6d6d6
| 135964 ||  || — || October 10, 2002 || Socorro || LINEAR || — || align=right | 6.9 km || 
|-id=965 bgcolor=#fefefe
| 135965 ||  || — || October 9, 2002 || Socorro || LINEAR || V || align=right | 1.2 km || 
|-id=966 bgcolor=#E9E9E9
| 135966 ||  || — || October 10, 2002 || Socorro || LINEAR || WIT || align=right | 2.7 km || 
|-id=967 bgcolor=#E9E9E9
| 135967 ||  || — || October 10, 2002 || Socorro || LINEAR || — || align=right | 4.8 km || 
|-id=968 bgcolor=#E9E9E9
| 135968 ||  || — || October 10, 2002 || Socorro || LINEAR || — || align=right | 3.4 km || 
|-id=969 bgcolor=#fefefe
| 135969 ||  || — || October 10, 2002 || Socorro || LINEAR || — || align=right | 1.7 km || 
|-id=970 bgcolor=#E9E9E9
| 135970 ||  || — || October 10, 2002 || Socorro || LINEAR || — || align=right | 4.3 km || 
|-id=971 bgcolor=#E9E9E9
| 135971 ||  || — || October 10, 2002 || Socorro || LINEAR || — || align=right | 1.5 km || 
|-id=972 bgcolor=#E9E9E9
| 135972 ||  || — || October 10, 2002 || Socorro || LINEAR || WIT || align=right | 2.4 km || 
|-id=973 bgcolor=#d6d6d6
| 135973 ||  || — || October 10, 2002 || Socorro || LINEAR || TEL || align=right | 3.2 km || 
|-id=974 bgcolor=#E9E9E9
| 135974 ||  || — || October 10, 2002 || Socorro || LINEAR || — || align=right | 3.2 km || 
|-id=975 bgcolor=#E9E9E9
| 135975 ||  || — || October 11, 2002 || Socorro || LINEAR || AEO || align=right | 2.3 km || 
|-id=976 bgcolor=#E9E9E9
| 135976 ||  || — || October 13, 2002 || Palomar || NEAT || — || align=right | 5.0 km || 
|-id=977 bgcolor=#E9E9E9
| 135977 ||  || — || October 12, 2002 || Socorro || LINEAR || WIT || align=right | 1.8 km || 
|-id=978 bgcolor=#E9E9E9
| 135978 Agüeros ||  ||  || October 4, 2002 || Apache Point || SDSS || — || align=right | 3.9 km || 
|-id=979 bgcolor=#E9E9E9
| 135979 Allam ||  ||  || October 10, 2002 || Apache Point || SDSS || MAR || align=right | 1.9 km || 
|-id=980 bgcolor=#E9E9E9
| 135980 Scottanderson ||  ||  || October 10, 2002 || Apache Point || SDSS || GEF || align=right | 2.2 km || 
|-id=981 bgcolor=#E9E9E9
| 135981 ||  || — || October 29, 2002 || Socorro || LINEAR || — || align=right | 6.3 km || 
|-id=982 bgcolor=#E9E9E9
| 135982 ||  || — || October 28, 2002 || Palomar || NEAT || ADE || align=right | 4.7 km || 
|-id=983 bgcolor=#E9E9E9
| 135983 ||  || — || October 28, 2002 || Palomar || NEAT || — || align=right | 5.0 km || 
|-id=984 bgcolor=#d6d6d6
| 135984 ||  || — || October 30, 2002 || Socorro || LINEAR || — || align=right | 9.6 km || 
|-id=985 bgcolor=#E9E9E9
| 135985 ||  || — || October 30, 2002 || Haleakala || NEAT || — || align=right | 3.9 km || 
|-id=986 bgcolor=#E9E9E9
| 135986 ||  || — || October 30, 2002 || Palomar || NEAT || — || align=right | 2.4 km || 
|-id=987 bgcolor=#d6d6d6
| 135987 ||  || — || October 30, 2002 || Haleakala || NEAT || NAE || align=right | 4.7 km || 
|-id=988 bgcolor=#E9E9E9
| 135988 ||  || — || October 30, 2002 || Haleakala || NEAT || — || align=right | 4.2 km || 
|-id=989 bgcolor=#E9E9E9
| 135989 ||  || — || October 30, 2002 || Haleakala || NEAT || AGN || align=right | 2.8 km || 
|-id=990 bgcolor=#E9E9E9
| 135990 ||  || — || October 30, 2002 || Haleakala || NEAT || GEF || align=right | 2.5 km || 
|-id=991 bgcolor=#E9E9E9
| 135991 Danarmstrong ||  ||  || October 31, 2002 || Jornada || D. S. Dixon || EUN || align=right | 2.6 km || 
|-id=992 bgcolor=#E9E9E9
| 135992 ||  || — || October 31, 2002 || Socorro || LINEAR || — || align=right | 3.1 km || 
|-id=993 bgcolor=#E9E9E9
| 135993 ||  || — || November 1, 2002 || Palomar || NEAT || — || align=right | 3.9 km || 
|-id=994 bgcolor=#d6d6d6
| 135994 ||  || — || November 5, 2002 || Socorro || LINEAR || EOS || align=right | 5.4 km || 
|-id=995 bgcolor=#E9E9E9
| 135995 ||  || — || November 5, 2002 || Socorro || LINEAR || — || align=right | 4.7 km || 
|-id=996 bgcolor=#E9E9E9
| 135996 ||  || — || November 5, 2002 || Socorro || LINEAR || — || align=right | 4.5 km || 
|-id=997 bgcolor=#E9E9E9
| 135997 ||  || — || November 5, 2002 || Socorro || LINEAR || — || align=right | 4.7 km || 
|-id=998 bgcolor=#d6d6d6
| 135998 ||  || — || November 5, 2002 || Socorro || LINEAR || EOS || align=right | 3.7 km || 
|-id=999 bgcolor=#E9E9E9
| 135999 ||  || — || November 5, 2002 || Socorro || LINEAR || — || align=right | 4.5 km || 
|-id=000 bgcolor=#E9E9E9
| 136000 ||  || — || November 5, 2002 || Socorro || LINEAR || — || align=right | 1.5 km || 
|}

References

External links 
 Discovery Circumstances: Numbered Minor Planets (135001)–(140000) (IAU Minor Planet Center)

0135